{{Infobox television season
| season_name          = Pinoy Big Brother: Kumunity
| bgcolour             = #34588F
| image                = PBBKS10 title card.png
| caption              = Official title card for Pinoy Big Brother: Kumunity Season 10| module1              = 
| country              = Philippines
| num_episodes         = 225 
| network              = Kapamilya Channel
| first_aired          =  – 
| last_aired           = 
| prev_season          = Connect| episode_list         = List of Pinoy Big Brother: Kumunity Season 10 photos made by Biga10
| next_season          = 
| season_number        = 10
}}Pinoy Big Brother: Kumunity Season 10, also known as Pinoy Big Brother Season 10, is the tenth main and sixteenth overall season of the Philippine reality television show, Pinoy Big Brother, which premiered on Kapamilya Channel, Jeepney TV and A2Z on October 16, 2021. This is the second season to partner up with social media app Kumu, made evident by the frequent use of the term "Kumunity", a portmanteau of Kumu and Community.

The season revolves around three batches of housemates representing three different Kumunities; the Celebrities, the Adults and the Teens. At the end of each batch, there will be a Top Two, who will gain eligibility to become the season's Big Winner, alongside four wildcard housemates chosen via a series of challenges.

Bianca Gonzalez-Intal and Robi Domingo reprised their roles as hosts for the season, while Kim Chiu, Melai Cantiveros and Enchong Dee were all elevated as co-main hosts for this season. Toni Gonzaga also reprised her role as the show's main host but has since stepped down from the role. Gonzalez has since assumed Gonzaga's duties as the show's main host.

The season concluded on May 29, 2022. After 226 days, celebrity housemate Anji Salvacion was named the season's Ultimate Big Winner, winning the two million peso grand prize, while adult housemate Isabel Laohoo was named the runner-up. Samantha Bernardo, Robert Blackburn, and Brenda Mage were the third to fifth placers, respectively.

Salvacion was the second celebrity winner in a combined season and the fourth celebrity winner overall since Daniel Matsunaga of All In in 2014.

Development
Auditions
The season was revealed first on August 27, 2021, during the noontime program It's Showtime with the announcement of audition mechanics. Due to the continuing impacts of COVID-19 in the country, the auditions took place in Kumu in a manner similar to the previous season. Each batch had different dates for their auditions; the auditions for the adults (ages ranging from 20 to 40 years) began on September 1 and initially ended on September 30, and the auditions for the teens (ages ranging from 15 to 19 years) which supposedly began on December 1, but was moved to November 6 during the first eviction episode as an early Christmas treat to the show's teenage viewers. The auditions for the teens concluded on December 31, 2021. Announced during the evictions of the celebrity edition, during the Teen Edition auditions, the ten auditionees with the "best audition clips" would win ₱10,000 each.

During the launch night, it was announced that the show received as total of 33,319 audition videos for the Adult Edition. Also announced was the extension of the submission of audition videos for the adults from October 16 to October 31.

Throughout the run-up to the Celebrity Edition premiere, a Kumu campaign was held to determine two celebrity housemates. This campaign was called Online Bahay ni Kuya ("Online Big Brother House"), and it consisted of online voting and challenges to its participants. Jordan Andrews and Benedix Ramos were announced as the winners of the campaign on October 15 and  entered the house as official housemates.

A second Online Bahay ni Kuya campaign was held for the Adult Edition. This time, the campaign had three winners to determine the three final adult housemates; one each for the Male Kumunity, Female Kumunity, and the LGBTQIA+ Kumunity. Andrei King, Kathleen Agir-Zarandin, and Roque Coting emerged as the Top 1 for their respective Kumunities, thus giving them the three final housemate spots for the Adult Edition and entered the house all together on Day 99, along with Glenda Victorio, the second houseguest of the season.

The last Online Bahay ni Kuya campaign was held for the Teen Edition. Unlike the previous Adult Kumunity auditions that had three winners, only one of the top 100 teen streamers who joined the open call auditions will be chosen as an official teen housemate. Paolo Alcantara was announced as the winner in the end.

COVID-19 precautions
Just like last season, the housemates, the hosts, the crew and staff of the show were RT-PCR tested; the housemates had also undergone quarantine prior to their entry to the House, and health and safety protocols were implemented. There was also no live audience present during live events and the crews were under a locked-in production.

However, from January 14, the show observed a short break in compliance to health and safety protocols following a sudden surge in COVID-19 cases in the Philippines caused by the Omicron variant. During the said break, recaps of the events in the ongoing adult batch were aired in place of the regular episodes through playing out never-before-seen scenes on television. The short break ended on January 19.

 Timeslot 
The show replaced Everybody, Sing! on weekends and airs on the Primetime Bida timeslot on weeknights. Following the season finale, the show aired six post-season special episodes on three weekends on June 4–19, 2022 before being replaced by the second season of Idol Philippines.

Overview
Logo
The logo for Pinoy Big Brother: Kumunity Season 10 revealed some changes. The eye features motifs inspired by and colors taken from the Philippine flag in a manner different from the eye used in the past two seasons. Also, the text's colors were also changed, spanning over gradients of blue and red, while the color of the season text was still emphasized with a gradient of bright yellow and orange.

The House
The facade of the Big Brother House was repainted with the colors of the Philippine flag. As the season started during the Filipino countdown to Christmas, the façade featured decorations such as lights and parol lanterns.

The interior of The House was fully renovated, with the color theme in the confession room being changed for their editions: yellow for Celebrity, red for Adult, blue for Teen, and all three colors for Biga-10. No major changes were made in the house interior, which still follows the original layout used in Otso. It featured the addition of neon lights based on the edition's theme: few lines from "Sikat ang Pinoy" for Celebrities, "Pinoy Tayo" for Adults, "Kabataang Pinoy" for Teens, and a mix of the three for Biga-10.

 Hosts 
Toni Gonzaga, Bianca Gonzalez, and Robi Domingo reprised their roles as the main hosts from the start of this season.

It was announced on February 9, 2022, that Gonzaga opted to step down as the show's primary host, endorsing Gonzalez to assume her duties. On February 12, 2022, Teen Edition 1 and Double Up Big Winners Kim Chiu and Melai Cantiveros, and former 737 houseguest Enchong Dee joined Gonzalez and Domingo to serve as this season's main hosts.

Former Otso Batch 4 housemate Sky Quizon and former 737 regular housemate Richard Juan hosted both PBB Kumulitan and the weekend version of the said companion show in replacement of the main hosts of the show. Juan also gives daily updates of the happenings inside the house through PBB Kumunity Season 10 Updates.

Maymay Entrata joined the hosting session in the big night as well as acting with the other hosts in the Uber-Acting.

This season's ex-housemates such as Eian Rances, Benedix Ramos, Karen Bordador, Jordan Andrews, the Juane siblings—Nathan and Raf, Zach Guerrero, Seham Daghlas, third big placer Samantha Bernardo, and runner-up Isabel Laohoo joined the roster of the online companion shows' hosts, and they commonly appear on PBB Kumulitan as temporary replacements for the main hosts, and on G sa Gabi in replacement for Domingo. All of them have appeared on the shows immediately after their respective evictions.

Several Kumu campaigns were held for the companion show: this gave aspiring housemates and Kumu users the chance to become a co-host in the show. Various houseguests that have entered inside the House had also a guest hosting appearance after their respective exits. Examples of these are Aly Palma, who appeared as a co-host of the show as a prize for winning the Houseguest for a Week campaign, and the two adult houseplayers, Marky Miranda and Jannene Nidoy, also had a special appearance in the show after their stay in the House as a houseplayer.

Theme songs
The theme song for Pinoy Big Brother: Kumunity Season 10 is a cover of Orange and Lemons' "Pinoy Ako" by Rico Blanco entitled as "Pinoy Tayo" which debuted on ASAP Natin 'To and on the opening night of the Adult Edition alongside ex-Celebrity housemates Alexa Ilacad and KD Estrada, and is being used in the Adult and the Biga-10 editions. The song, which now includes vibrant yet old-style Filipino folk music elements, was composed by ABS-CBN Music Director Jonathan Manalo, Clem Castro, and Rico Blanco himself.

In addition, a cover of Toni Gonzaga and Sam Milby's "Sikat ang Pinoy" by the OPM band Agsunta and Pinoy rapper Kritiko was used alongside "Pinoy Tayo" in the Celebrity Edition. A cover of the Itchyworms's "Kabataang Pinoy" by OPM band Nameless Kids was first introduced in November 2021, but was replaced by another cover through a collaboration of P-pop groups BINI and SB19, and was used as the Teen Edition's main theme. The Nameless Kids rendition, however, was used somehow for promotional purposes during the Teen Edition's run.

Eviction theme songs were used in at least three editions of this season: "Piece Of The Puzzle", written and performed by Trisha Denise Campañer, was used in the Celebrity Edition; "When I See You Again", written and performed by Alexa Ilacad and KD Estrada, was used in the Adult Edition; and "Dalampasigan", written and performed by Celebrity Kumunity Top 2 and eventual winner Anji Salvacion was used in the Teen Edition. Both "When I See You Again" and "Dalampasigan" are both composed during Ilacad, Estrada, and Salvacion's respective stints in the Celebrity Edition.

Prizes
In the Celebrity Edition Finale, it was announced that every housemate that becomes part of their respective Kumunity's Top Two will receive one hundred thousand pesos (₱100,000).

At the start of the Biga-10's stay in the house, it was announced that the housemates would be competing for a grand prize of two million pesos (₱2,000,000). Meanwhile, the second and third big placers are poised to receive five hundred thousand pesos (₱500,000) and three hundred thousand pesos (₱300,000) from the show, while the fourth and fifth big placers will receive two hundred thousand pesos (₱200,000) and one hundred thousand pesos (₱100,000) respectively courtesy of Brilliant Skin Essentials.

Format
Three batches known as Kumunities will enter the House and will compete to earn a spot in their respective Top Twos. Following the conclusion of the Celebrity Batch, the Top Twos of each Kumunity, along with four other evicted wildcard housemates, will return to the house to compete again and try to become a member of the Ultimate Big 5, and eventually, as the winner of the whole season.

The first Kumunity to enter was the Celebrities, which was followed by the Adults, and then the Teens.

Twists
The following twists were implemented throughout the season's entire run.

All batches
The following twists were implemented for the three batches, excluding the Kumunity Decides! twist which was carried over up to the Biga-10 batch. 

 Head of Household – Carried over from the previous season, those who earned the title were granted immunity from being nominated in the upcoming nomination week.
 Padaluck – Also used in the previous season, the public has the chance to give an advantage to a housemate. The advantage was given to the housemate who had received the most "padalucks" or virtual gifts through Kumu's livestream gifting system.
 Online Bahay Ni Kuya – Kumu users will have the chance to become official housemates after finishing several online tasks via Kumu prepared by the show.
 Powers – Various housemates from all Kumunities were given powers for completing tasks given by Big Brother, such as by giving them special and secret tasks, and the Follower Sprint task.
 Nomination Immunity Pass – A power given to winners of tasks or challenges held on or before their Kumunitys stay in the house, this will give its holder the option to give themselves immunity for a round of their choosing.
Follower Sprint – An online live stream challenge wherein the housemate who had gained the most number of new followers on Kumu will be given a Nomination Immunity Pass. 
The first Follower Sprint task for the Celebrities was composed of two rounds: the first was done prior to their entry into the House, and the second round was held from October 30 to November 1. Madam Inutz won this sprint and therefore was given a Nomination Immunity Pass for having the most followers at the end of their sprint.
The second Follower Sprint task for the Adults was composed of three rounds: the first round was held on January 22 to 26 for the first ten adult housemates (Aleck, Gin, Isabel, Laziz, Michael Ver, Nathan, Raf, Seham, Thamara, and Zach), the second round was held on January 27 to 31 for the six newly entered adult housemates (Andrei, Basti, Jaye, Kathleen, Rica, and Roque), and the final round was held on February 1 to 4 for all the adult housemates. Isabel won this sprint and thus was given a Nomination Immunity Pass for having the most followers at the end of their sprint.
The third Follower Sprint task for the Teens was only one round held on March 20 to 25. Gabb won this sprint and thus was given a Nomination Immunity Pass for having the most followers at the end of their sprint.
  Kumunity Decides! – Kumu users, through an online poll on the app on the shows daily livestream, can drop virtual gifts to a housemate of their choice via Kumu's gifting system and are collectively given a power to decide and give a certain challenge(s), task(s), or advantage(s) to a/the housemate(s) who had received the highest number of vote(s).
 The Ten Million Diamonds Challenge – The Final 5 housemates of each Kumunity will compete to earn a portion of the ten million diamonds in order to help themselves from getting evicted in their respective final evictions, and to become one of the Top 2 of their respective Kumunities.

Celebrity Edition twists
 Houseguest for a Week – The top Kumu live streamer who will earn the most Kumu gifts on November 6 to 12, 2021 during the Celebrity Edition will become a houseguest for a week.
 Unli-Voting – From the second to the eighth celebrity evictions, the public is given the power to vote past the voting limit through SMS and Kumu for the 48 hours preceding the closing of the poll. It was discontinued starting on the final week of the Celebrity Edition and by extension, to the later parts of the season due to negative feedback and criticism from the viewers.
 Pinoy Big Brother Games 2021 – During the Celebrity Edition, the celebrities were divided into three teams, and the team with the most points earned after three rounds of games will earn immunity from the sixth celebrity nominations.
 Kuya's Christmas Elf – One of the top 10 Kumu streamers will become Big Brother's Christmas elf. As an elf, he or she is going to deliver to the housemates their given tasks and some of Big Brother's messages virtually or in person.

Adult Edition twists
The Follower Sprint twist, Nomination Immunity Pass, and the Ten Million Diamonds Challenge were carried over to this edition. The twists below were the additional twists implemented on this edition.

Pre-existing Relationships – Two of the adult housemates, Nathan and Raf Juane, who are siblings in real life, were tasked to serve their fellow housemates in the opening days of the Adult Batch while maintaining their relationship as siblings as a secret. If the siblings manage to keep their secret, they will be given their first weekly budget and one of them will be given a Nomination Immunity Pass.
 Ligtask Challenges – Nominated housemates will undergo several challenges to save themselves from evictions. These will serve as an eviction process for the nominated housemates.
 Houseplayers — The Adult Edition first featured houseplayers that can possibly snatch Final Five spots by posing as late-entry housemates, through methods of sabotaging the House and threatening the housemates, and by accomplishing tasks given by Big Brother.
Challengers — The Adult Edition featured the other four Final 5 housemates the possibility to snatch all the diamonds from its reigning diamond holder through a series of challenger tasks given by Big Brother.
 Group Challenge — The Teen Edition featured the Teen housemates competing against a group of Teen houseplayers to get a portion of the ten million diamonds on two group challenges.
 Secret Room — The Adult Edition also featured the adult housemates that were fake evicted for failing their Ligtask challenge. Instead of being actually evicted from the House, they were sent to a secret room by Big Brother until his given time.

Teen Edition twists
The Follower Sprint twist, Houseplayers twist, Nomination Immunity Pass, and the Ten Million Diamonds Challenge were also carried over to this edition. The twists below were the additional twists implemented on this edition.

 Outside World Destination — Last used in Otso, instead of entering the House immediately, the Teen housemates were sent into a remote location up in the mountains and were divided into two groups. They must complete a series of tasks and challenges given by Big Brother to grant them access into the House.
 K.E.A (Kuya's Executive Assistant) — During the Teen Edition, Big Brother announced to his teen housemates that he'll leave the house temporarily for an undisclosed reason. In connection to this, he introduced his savvy virtual assistant named K.E.A (short for Kuya's Executive Assistant) that the housemates can communicate with her on a separate room. Unbeknownst to the Teen housemates, K.E.A was "hacked" by a scammer by catfishing the housemates. This gave them and the viewers a valuable lesson regarding social media fraud.
 Kuya's Task Master — Similar to Kuya's Christmas Elf, the Teen Edition featured a task master in which the winner of this campaign on Kumu will distribute tasks and messages in behalf of Big Brother virtually or in person. Hiroshi Aruelo won this campaign and appeared virtually on May 5 to explain the Plate Balancing weekly task.

Biga-10 twists
 Biga-10 Pasabog — Big Brother revealed the 10 revelations that will continue after the Teen Kumunity and the events that will follow to the end of the season. Some of the revelations revealed were the Biga-10 housemates twist, the comeback housemates twist, and the relinquishment of Alyssa Valdez's Kumunity Top Two position.
 Biga-10 Housemates — Ten housemates (six from the Top Twos and four "comeback housemates") from all three editions will return to the house for a chance in claiming one of the spots for the Ultimate Big 5.
 Comeback Housemates — In addition to the Top Twos returning to the house, two evictees from each Kumunity would return to compete for a wildcard spot as part of the Biga-10 housemates.
 Biga-10 Comeback — In a Kumu Campaign, the three Kumunities will compete for diamonds to secure their respective Kumunity two wildcard spots on the Biga-10 housemates, with the remaining spots being determined through challenges.
 Kumuni-Test — Big Brother would give challenges to the three Kumunities that tests their camaraderie and teamwork in order to determine the Ultimate Big 5 housemates of the season.

 Batches 
The season is divided into four parts: the Celebrities, Adults, Teens, and the Biga-10 batch. Below is the summary of the editions outcomes.

 Celebrities 

A total of 17 celebrity housemates have entered the house, with 12 of them entering the house during the kick-off launch while the five remaining housemates entered days later. Two of the celebrity housemates (Benedix Ramos and Jordan Andrews) were chosen from the Online Bahay ni Kuya campaign on Kumu.

The celebrity edition ran from October 16, 2021, until January 1, 2022, spanning 78 days. Alyssa Valdez and Anji Salvacion were proclaimed as the Top Two of this Kumunity.

 Adults 

A total of 16 civilian housemates have entered the house, with the Juane siblings, Nathan and Raf, entered the house a day earlier on January 1 during the Celebrity Top 2 reveal before the other housemates entered the house a day later. This edition is most notable for its double evictions and a rare triple eviction. Three of the civilian housemates (Andrei King, Kathleen Agir, and Roque Coting) were chosen from the Online Bahay ni Kuya campaign on Kumu.

The adult edition ran from January 2 until March 12, 2022, spanning 70 days. Nathan Juane and Isabel Laohoo were proclaimed as the Top Two of this Kumunity.

 Teens 

A total of 13 teen housemates have entered the house, with the teen housemates spending their first week outside of the house in an isolated island away from the Big Brother house. One teen housemate (Paolo Alcantara) was chosen from the Online Bahay ni Kuya campaign on Kumu.

The teen edition ran from March 13 until May 14, 2022, spanning 63 days. Rob Blackburn and Gabb Skribikin were proclaimed as the Top Two of this Kumunity.

 Biga-10 

A total of 12 housemates from the three Kumunities, including the Top Twos and the wildcards, entered the house and battled for the four (then five) spots for the finale. Only ten housemates (dubbed as the Biga-10 housemates) remained on the heat of the competition where they must work together in their respective Kumunities to get the three (or four) spots for their Kumunity on the finale.

The Biga-10 batch ran from May 15 to 29, 2022, spanning 14 days. Anji Salvacion of the Celebrities emerged as the winner of the season, with Isabel Laohoo of the Adults finishing as the runner-up. Samantha Bernardo, Rob Blackburn, and Brenda Mage were the third to fifth big placers, respectively.

 Housemates 
Prior to the start of each edition, the identities of a number of housemates would be revealed daily in the days leading up to the premiere on the show's social media accounts and on the show's online companion show entitled PBB Kumulitan. More housemates were announced in the companion show during each edition's premiere, with the winners of the Online Bahay ni Kuya campaign being revealed later.

With 46 housemates participating across all editions covered during the season, the season saw the second largest cast in the show's history, just behind Otso's 58-housemate cast.

 Notes 
  On Day 197, Alyssa relinquished her spot on the Biga-10 while outside the house. She made the decision as a result of her prior commitments as part of the Philippines women's national volleyball team, which will compete in the 2021 Southeast Asian Games, conflicting with the schedule allotted for the Biga-10's stay in the house. Samantha, by virtue of having the next most votes in the final eviction poll, took her place in the Biga-10 and the Celebrity Top 2 as a result.

 Housemate selection via Kumu 
As similar to the previous season, six housemates (two, three, and one for the Celebrities, Adults, and Teens respectively) were selected via Kumu for all the Kumunities via Online Bahay ni Kuya on Kumu. The only requirement for aspiring housemates to join the Online Bahay ni Kuya campaign was to audition from the announcements and specified date announced by the show for each Kumunity. Then, they must do a live stream for a specified date until the end of each campaign. Each streamer must ask from its viewers for specified virtual gifts—the more virtual gifts, the better chances of winning a spot. Then, the streamer(s) with the highest number of diamonds earned will become a housemate of this season (depending on the number of winners for their Kumunity.) The top 100 streamers that were included in the top 100 leaderboard of each Kumunity campaign will move on to another round of elimination until five streamers remain to determine the result of each campaign. Each Kumunity had a different set of winners.

From October 14–15, 2021, the final housemate selection for the Celebrities was held where Jordan Andrews and Benedix Ramos were selected as the two final celebrity housemates for the Celebrity Edition; for the Adults, it was held from December 1, 2021, until January 1, 2022, where one winner emerged from each of the three Kumunities of the campaign: Andrei King for the Male category, Kathleen Agir for the Female category, and Roque Coting for the LGBTQIA+ category; and lastly, for the Teens, it was held from March 11–12, 2022 where John Paolo Alcantara emerged as the winner of the campaign.

The table below shows the top five diamond earners of each campaign for each Kumunity during the entirety of the season's online campaign. The ages and hometowns displayed are based on the time they have submitted their respective audition videos during the duration of their auditions for their respective Kumunities.

Episodes

The show airs at 5:45 pm on weekdays (PST) after Kapamilya Gold Hits (on Kapamilya Channel), Afternoon Zinema (on A2Z), and on Kapamilya Online Live on YouTube, 7:45 pm on Saturdays (PST) after My Papa Pi and at 7:00 pm on Sundays (PST) after TV Patrol Weekend (on Kapamilya Channel and on A2Z), and on Kapamilya Online Live.

Starting on November 1, 2021, weekday episodes shown at the 5:45 pm timeslot (PST) will have an encore broadcast at 11:15 pm (PST) on Kapamilya Channel after The World Tonight and on Kapamilya Online Live.

On December 18, 2021, the show was preempted by Andito Tayo para sa Isa't Isa: The ABS-CBN Christmas Special 2021. The housemates, however, joined the said special program wherein they performed a production number dancing to the remixed version of ABS-CBN's Christmas Station ID. They were also joined by the evicted ex-celebrity housemates who had danced in front of the Big Brother House.

In observance of the Holy Week, the show did not air its original episodes from Maundy Thursday to Black Saturday, April 14 to 16, 2022. Instead, the show aired special episodes featuring highlights of each of the seasons' editions each day. The show did resume on Easter Sunday, April 17, 2022.

On May 9, 2022, the show was pre-empted by the Halalan 2022: The ABS-CBN News 31-Hour Special Coverage.

The show had already broadcast 225 episodes during the season's entire run.

Houseguests
As with the previous season, houseguests may visit the housemates virtually or in person.

 Celebrities 
 Online Guesting
 Day 22: Lucky 7 Big Winner Maymay Entrata had a dance number with the celebrity housemates after they were tasked to do a choreography for her song "Amakabogera."
 Day 28: AC Bonifacio promoted her new single under Star Magic Records entitled "Fool No Mo" by playing its music video for the housemates and, through a recorded video message, told them to put a bandage and share a story about how they overcame an adversity and healed from it.
 Day 33: 2020 Tokyo Olympics silver medalist Nesthy Petecio gave a message to the housemates, and then declared the Pinoy Big Brother Games 2021 open.
 Day 34: 2020 Tokyo Olympics bronze medalist Eumir Marcial sent a good luck greeting to the housemates before their land swimming competition in the Pinoy Big Brother Games 2021.
 Day 57: AC Bonifacio and former 737 regular housemate Zeus Collins were invited by Big Brother to judge the housemates' performance for their Sikat ang Sayaw ng Pinoy weekly task.
 Day 67: For winning the Kuya's Christmas Elf Kumu Campaign, US-based Alyssa "Ysang" Ramos became Big Brother's house elf for a week.
 Day 75: Ogie Diaz hosted the final tell all of the Celebrity Final 5 together with this season's former Celebrity housemates.

 Physical Guesting
 Day 54: For winning the Houseguest for a Week Kumu Campaign, Aly Palma spent a week in the House to help the housemates with the Sikat ang Sayaw ng Pinoy weekly task.

Adults 
 Online Guesting
 Day 121: Lyg Carillo, also known as Maria Christina, a drag queen, helped the housemates virtually in regards on their PBB Drag Race weekly task. She was tasked to practice the housemates' journey to being a drag queen and helped in creating their gowns.
 Day 122: Eva Le Queen, a drag queen, also helped the housemates in their PBB Drag Race task a day after Carillo's virtual guesting. She was tasked to judge the housemates' dance for their weekly task.
 Day 126: Brigiding, a drag queen, and former 737 regular housemate Dawn Chang were invited by Big Brother to judge the housemates' performance for their PBB Drag Race weekly task.

 Physical Guesting
 Day 99: First entered as a houseguest from the previous season, Brilliant Skin Essentials CEO Glenda Victorio returned to the Big Brother House again as a houseguest to assist the Adult housemates with their Big Online 10-dahan weekly task. Victorio stayed inside the house for two weeks until her exit on Day 112.

 Teens 
 Online Guesting
 Day 178: John Bradley "Jan-Jan" Ronato, Tiff's autistic brother, got to spend time with Tiff and the housemates through Zoom in occupational therapy and mathematics sessions as part of her sacrifice task.
 Day 184: As a response to the widely criticized History Quiz Bee, historian Xiao Chua was invited to help Big Brother in re-educating the housemates in learning Philippine history as part of their History Week task.
 Day 196: Lilibeth and Simon Alford, Luke's parents, appeared virtually on Zoom to have a talk with Luke in the confession room, especially to his father that he had not been seen for 11 years.
 Day 202: Hiroshi Aruelo, the winner of Kuya's Task Master campaign on Kumu, appeared virtually to explain the Plate Balancing weekly task to the Teen housemates.
 Day 204: Paz Blackburn and Nelflor Jordan, Rob and Stephanie's respective mothers, appeared virtually to have one-on-one chat with Rob and Stephanie as a reward for completing the How Well Do You Know Each Other task.

 Physical Guesting
 Day 178: Paz Blackburn and Ana Marie Lim, Rob and Ashton's respective mothers, were invited inside as they were to see Rob and Ashton separately as part of their secret tasks. Prior to this, the mothers were given a task and helped Eslam and Stef in their secret task for the two boys. Rob was able to spend time with Paz with a fine dining dinner date, while Ashton had the same with Ana Marie with a picnic table date.
 Day 186: JC Alcantara entered the house to perform tasks with Tour Group members before reuniting with brother Paolo in the Museum Group. Bonifacio "Tatay Dennis" Alcantara, Paolo's father, joined JC and the Tour Group as they enter the Museo ni Kuya witnessing the Museum Group recreate Paolo's family picture in their human diorama challenge with JC joining in, and reunite with Paolo for a brief period.
 Day 194: P-pop groups MNL48 (Coleen, Ella, and Jem) and SB19 entered the house as mentors to teach the housemates in singing and dancing choreography in preparation for the upcoming The Big KumuniTEEN Summer Concert weekly task. SB19 would go on to stay inside the house and be with the housemates in the coming days until the time of their concert, while MNL48 exited the house the same day after their entrance.
 Day 196: Elizabeth El Gohari, Eslam's mother, entered the house to celebrate Eslam's birthday celebration and reunited with him along with the other housemates and SB19 for a brief period of time.
 Day 204: Evelyn Alcantara, Flora Mae Trinidad, Jessica Ronato, Marianne Mayores, and Rosalinda Skribikin, the respective mothers of Paolo, Maxine, Tiff, Dustine, and Gabb, entered the house to help the housemates in cleaning the house while wearing PPEs before eventually reuniting with the housemates to celebrate Mother's Day inside the house.

 Biga-10 
 Online Guesting
 Day 216: Flora Mae Trinidad, Maxine's mother, appeared virtually on Zoom to see her before she left the house that same day.
 Day 217: Lovely Cabantog, Madam Inutz's younger sister, appeared virtually on Zoom to see her before she left the house that same day.
 Physical Guesting
 Day 221: Ex-housemates Eian Rances from Celebrity Edition, Laziz Rustamov of Adult Edition, and Luke Alford of Teen Edition re-entered the house as ninjas before eventually reuniting with the Biga-10 housemates to help them in completing their Stacking Colored Tower Cups weekly task.
 Day 224: Ex-housemate and ex-Celebrity Kumunity Top Two member Alyssa Valdez re-entered the house to reunite with the Biga-10 housemates and hosted the Palarong Pangpa-Good Vibes.

Houseplayers
This season featured houseplayers that served as a challenge to the current housemates through methods such as sabotaging, harsh behaviors, acting as a threat to their status as a housemate, and competing with the housemates in the series of tasks intended to bring a set of housemates to the Final Five of each Kumunity. Most of the rules observed by the housemates still apply to the houseplayers.

The chosen houseplayers will then enter the house after they have successfully completed their mandatory quarantine and COVID-19 testing at a later date as part of the show's strict health protocols.

Adults
To determine the first two houseplayers of the season, two separate Kumu campaigns were held during the run of the Adult Edition. The top five winners will first undergo screening with the production team of the show, wherein one of them in each campaign will become a houseplayer and have the chance to become a co-host in PBB Kumulitan, the show's online companion show. As for the other four streamers that are not chosen, they will instead have a virtual appearance in the house—they explained the task that was given to them and to the housemates.

The first campaign was held on January 22 until January 27, 2022, while the second campaign was held on February 5 until February 10, 2022. Marky Miranda and Jannene Anne Nidoy were selected the first two houseplayers of the season.

 Marky Miranda is the season's first houseplayer. By impressing the housemates with his strong aura and personality at first, he successfully sabotaged the housemates by posing as a late-entry housemate, and then acting crazy and rebellious after he had a quick glimpse of the housemates. After drinking whiskey while Zach Guerrero was celebrating his birthday inside the house, Miranda had a confrontation with Guerrero, Nathan Juane, and Michael Ver Comaling. The next day, they apologized to each other.
 Jannene Anne "Ja" Nidoy is the season's second houseplayer. Entering the same day as Miranda, she was very shy to the housemates at first, but she immediately became friends with Raf Juane and Seham Daghlas after revealing her occupation as a vlogger and an influencer. Even though she and Miranda had a plan to sabotage the housemates, she handed the sabotage button over to Miranda alone and stayed with Juane during the confrontation by between fellow houseplayer Miranda and Guerrero by acting innocent—that she didn't know about it. She also had a close friendship with the Adult Final Five shortly after their exit.

Teens
Another campaign for the Teen Edition was held on April 2 until April 8, 2022. Out of the top ten diamond earners, only three of them will be selected as the official houseplayers for the Teen Edition—they will play as a group to challenge the housemates through a series of tasks given by Big Brother. The seven unchosen earners will instead have their respective co-host slots in PBB Kumulitan and will receive exclusive merch from Kumu. They will also undergo screening first with the production team of the show similar to the previous edition's campaign.

David Charles Longinotti, Erica Dimaculangan, and Lyanna Ong Fontanilla were selected to become the teen houseplayers for the Teen edition. They were first introduced on PBB Kumulitan during the sixth live eviction night on May 8 before the three of them entered the house the next day.

 Alyanna "Yanna" Fontanilla is the season's first teen houseplayer and the third houseplayer overall. Less stricter than Dimaculangan and Longinotti, she may be also strict like Dimaculangan in the camp site, but in reality, she is the most kindest houseplayer and the most determined houseplayer to date.
 David Charles Longinotti is the season's second teen houseplayer and the fourth houseplayer overall. With the housemates impressed by his looks but not to his strictness as a camp master, he would then be strict to the housemates whenever they perform the task where they must crawl 10 times in a crawling area on the camp site back and forth.
 Erica "Ika" Dimaculangan is the season's third teen houseplayer and the fifth houseplayer overall. The most critic of the group, she is more stricter than Longinotti but is even more stricter to the housemates that she is almost getting to the point that she becomes angry whenever the housemates do not follow her instructions.

With the houseplayers successfully stealing the housemates' seven million diamonds out of the possible ten in the Ten Million Diamonds Group Challenge, they have proved that teamwork, determination, and patience is the key when it comes to Big Brother's tasks.

All of them have formed friendships with the Teen housemates almost immediately after the "camp masters" (what the housemates called them during the time of their stay) revealed their true status to the Teen housemates on Day 209. They exited the house minutes after their announcement after a short bonding with each other.

Tasks
Weekly tasks
As part of every season, weekly tasks are given in order for the housemates to earn a larger budget for their groceries. For this season, however, not only will they receive their weekly budget, special rewards will be awarded or a contribution to a particular Kumunity or beneficiary is provided by Big Brother and the housemates.

{| class="wikitable" style="text-align:center; font-size:100%; line-height:18px;" width="100%"

|-
! style="width: 10%;" | Task No.
! style="width: 10%;" | Date given
! style="width: 70%;" | Task title and description
! style="width: 10%;" | Result
|-
! colspan="4" | Celebrities
|-
! 1
| October 17(Day 2)
| align="left" | Pa-Mine Pa More (I'll Take More) The housemates were tasked to sell online all the 500 items given throughout the week. They were given the discretion in how much they will price the items.

During the live online selling, the housemates were only allowed to sell once the bell sound was played and were only allotted three hours per day to do the task. Also as a reward for the task, the amount they will earn will be given to their loved ones or their chosen charity.

At the end of the task, the housemates had earned ₱21,740; they chose to give the entire earnings to the female BJMP detainees where Karen was previously incarcerated.
| style="background:#99FF66;" | Passed
|-
! 2
| October 25 (Day 9)
| align="left" | Takot ang Pinoy (Pinoy is Afraid)The housemates have to create, write, and produce a live 30-minute horror musical play. As part of the twist for this task, two of the major characters of their play were selected via Kumunity Decides, and the result thereof was only revealed minutes before the start of the said play.

To win this task, they need to get a total of 80,000 average viewers across Facebook, Kumu and Kapamilya Online Live.

| style="background:#99FF66;" | Passed
|-
! 3
| November 3(Day 19)
| align="left" | Tumba Table (Tippy Table)Similar to the Otso season's Batch-Bakan Challenge, one at a time, the housemates had to place 170 blocks on a hanging but unstable table. If ever a block falls or tumbles on or off the table, they will have to restock their blocks from the start. Only one pair of housemates at a time can place each of their blocks on the table. They will need to stock all blocks in a standing or horizontal position and they must finish this task within one hour.
| style="background:#FF6666" | Failed
|-
! 4
| November 9(Day 25)
| align="left" | Sa Linyang Kainan (Online Restaurant)The housemates were tasked to cook and serve two specialty dishes of their own choice: one Filipino dish and one international dish (they chose Sisig and Ramen). The dishes will be served in a pre-order basis and will be made available to all Metro Manila residents only. The show had partnered with Grab Express for the delivery of the dishes they have prepared.

One of the basis to determine if they will be successful with this task is from the customers' feedbacks (the housemates must gain at least 1000 aggregate star rating).

The proceeds from the income they have earned from this task, including the online livestream jam, will be given to the Philippine Mental Health Association.
| style="background:#99FF66" | Passed
|-
! 5
| colspan="3" | The housemates were given their fifth weekly task while they were also participating in the Pinoy Big Brother Games 2021. However, the entire task was not broadcast by the show and was only partially streamed via Kumu. The entire mechanics and the outcome of this weekly task remained unknown.
|-
! 6
| November 23(Day 39)
| align="left" | PBB ArcadeFor the entire week, the housemates must be able to earn a total of 100 tickets by playing games prepared by Big Brother. In addition to this, they were also instructed to freeze themselves and act as toys (while wearing their toy costumes) when they will hear the sound of a "person walking," as if they were being checked by such person (which was revealed to be the housemates' loved-ones). This is akin to the Toy Story movie franchise wherein the toys don't move when any human is around. They will only be allowed to move once the same sound will be played to them again. Also, at the start of the day, a "magical sound" will be played to alert them that they have to don immediately their toy costumes.

In any instance where each of them had moved despite the sound is being played, one violation will be given. And per violation, one ticket will be deducted from them.

| style="background:#99FF66;" | Passed
|-
! 7
| December 3(Day 49)
| align="left" | ReunitedUsing their blocks, each team will need to meet halfway in the activity area using their blocks as pathways. After meeting at the center, all them must build a three layer platform that should be able to fit them all in it. They will not be reunited if cannot hold at the platform for 30 seconds, or finish the task for more than an hour. If they are successful with this task, the housemates will be reunited and they will be able to win their weekly budget.
| style="background:#99FF66;" | Passed
|-
! 8
| December 6(Day 52)
| align="left" | Sikat ang Sayaw ng Pinoy (Pinoy Dance is Famous)The housemates must be able to create a dance choreography to the tune of their edition's theme song "Sikat ang Pinoy." In their choreography, it must include dance steps from ballroom, hiphop and folkdance. Each housemate must also be able to contribute a dance step to their entire choreography. For their final performance, all of them will be required to wear headphones with one housemate being selected to wear a headphone that plays the distorted or off-tempo version of the song. Also, in the event they committed three mistakes in one round, they have three chances to perform the dance presentation all over again. To win this task, they must receive a total score of not less than 88% from the guest judges.

| style="background:#99FF66;" | Passed
|-
! 9
| December 14(Day 60)
| align="left" | Makuha Ka Sa Tingin (You Get to Look) With their cone-shaped masks on throughout the task, the housemates segregated into three groups must get the giant puzzle pieces from the garden and pool areas (for Baby Jesus) and within the activity area (for Mary and Joseph), and bring them to the activity area where they will build the rectangular puzzle of a character from the Nativity scene: Baby Jesus, Mary, and Joseph. If completed, not only the housemates will receive their weekly budget, they will give the amount of one hundred thousand Philippine pesos (PHP 100,000) for the Philippine Accessible Disability Services, Inc. (PADS), this season's second beneficiary.

| style="background:#99FF66;" | Passed
|-
! 10
| December 22(Day 68)
| align="left" | Andito Tayo Para Sa Isa't IsaThe housemates will dress as reindeers to deliver a large Christmas gift. In the activity area, a 14-layered Christmas tree has to be stacked using green cups and a yellow cup (to evoke the star on the Christmas tree-top) on top of the cart, to which they will pull around the house-shaped route. To complete the challenge, they must turn around for a hundred times without letting the cups fall; otherwise, they must return and redo from the starting point. Once completed, they will be able to give one hundred thousand Philippine pesos (PHP 100,000) to the families and communities affected by Typhoon Odette.
| style="background:#99FF66;" | Passed
|-
! colspan="4" | Adults
|-
! 1
| January 1(Day 78)
| align="left" | Secret Siblings TaskA day before the entry of the other adult housemates, Nathan and Raf were given their first weekly task. They must make sure that for the entire week, the others will not find out that they are siblings.
| style="background:#99FF66;" | Passed
|-
! 2
| January 9(Day 86)
| align="left" | Build a HouseThree at a time, the housemates must build a six-feet house made by wall blocks using an improvised tools made by Aleck, Michael Ver, and Zach were isolated in the secret room. Meanwhile, the three isolated housemates must build the frame and roof of the house they built. The housemates must not use their hands to place the blocks—instead, they must use the tools provided by the three isolated housemates. To complete the task, the house must be stable within ten minutes. Once completed, the reward of a task is to re-build Gin's house that was devastated by Typhoon Odette.
| style="background:#99FF66;" | Passed
|-
! 3
| January 18(Day 95)
| align="left" | Pinoy Big Video ChallengeThe housemates were tasked to create three videos that will be posted on the show's social media accounts the day after the shooting of their videos. The housemates must reach at least 10,000 Kumu Klips of their videos that must be re-enacted by the Kumunity through Kumu to win this task.
| style="background:#FF6666;" |Failed
|-
! 4
| January 24(Day 101)
| align="left" | The Big Online 10-dahan (English: The Big Online Store)The housemates must form an online startup company to buy and sell the products that they have made through a series of tasks. The boss of their company can be replaced once voted by a majority; the incumbent boss within the end of the weekly task will be given immunity for the first nominations.

To win this task, they must earn a capital of a minimum of at least ₱75,000 and a maximum of ₱100,000 at the end of the week. The sales that they will earn at the end of this task will then be donated to the victims of Typhoon Odette.

The incumbent boss of the company must not participate on the capital tasks; only the board members and Glenda, the houseguest, can participate.

| style="background:#99FF66;" | Passed
|-
!5
|February 7(Day 115)
|align="left" | Love SacrificeIn connection to the upcoming Valentine's Day celebration inside the House, the housemates must create enough paper flowers to fill the big broken heart found in the center of the activity area.
| style="background:#99FF66;" | Passed
|-
!6
|February 13(Day 121)
|align="left" | PBB Drag RaceSimilar to RuPaul's Drag Race, the housemates must dress, act, and perform like drag queens and must do a dancing and lip-syncing challenge.

To complete this task, both groups must get at least 90% of the average score from the judges and from the Kumunity.Teams:Roqueens: Roque (leader), Isabel, Jaye, Nathan, Seham, and ZachGinwin: Gin (leader), Basti, Kathleen, Laziz, Michael Ver, and Raf

| style="background:#FF6666" | Failed
|-
!7
|February 23(Day 131)
|align="left" | Endurance ChallengeTo test their endurance, patience, and teamwork, the housemates must build 10 wooden pillars at the height of a circular base. Each wooden pillar is 1 foot high and each pillar has two wooden blocks that overlap. Once completed, they should lay a circle cover on top of it.

The five housemates inside the house (Laziz, Michael Ver, Nathan, Raf, and Seham) need to move the pillars by pulling the leash to transport it from the garden area to a stand located in front of the activity area, while the five other housemates that were fake-evicted during their Ligtask challenge (Gin, Isabel, Kathleen, Roque, and Zach) in the activity area do the same from one end of the activity area to the other. The housemates should not be too close to the base of the handle of the strap. There are fixed knots on the ropes as a sign of the correct distance between them.

If this task is considered successful, the housemates will not only receive their weekly budget, they will also be reunited with the fake-evicted housemates.
| style="background:#99FF66;" | Passed
|-
!8
|March 2(Day 138)
|align="left" | Stand UpThe housemates, including the houseplayers, must stand up for eight hours. The timer displayed on a TV located in the living area will start once the housemates stand when the weekly task leaders have announced the weekly task to the housemates. The timer will temporarily stop when a housemate sits, kneels, or leans during the duration of the weekly task, even when the housemates use the comfort room, or sits in the confession room, except for when they are called by Big Brother for their bed time.

When the housemates wake up in the morning during the duration of this weekly task, they have five seconds to immediately stand up after they hear the wake-up call as a sign that the timer will start ticking again. For the final night of this weekly task, both the housemates and the houseplayers were challenged to walk and stand constantly without giving up for a period amount of time, as said and set by Big Brother.

If the housemates and the houseplayers manage to stand for eight hours within the end of the week, they will be given their weekly budget; otherwise, if they don't, they will lose their weekly budget and must ration their food for their final week in the House.
| style="background:#99FF66;" | Passed
|-
!9
|March 6(Day 142)
|align="left" | Charity TaskServed as both a charity and a weekly task, five selected housemates must step on a color-coded part on the floor chosen by a digital roulette. Then, they must use a paddle to pass a ball to another housemate to a container provided in the play area.

One hundred pesos (₱100) will be added for every ball inserted in the container. They can shoot a maximum of 1,000 balls for this weekly task, possibly giving one hundred thousand pesos (₱100,000) if they shoot all of the balls to the chosen charity.

All of the earnings that they will accumulate after the end of this weekly task will be donated to St. Arnold Janssen Kalinga Foundation, Inc., the fifth beneficiary Kumunity for this season.
| style="background:#99FF66;" | Passed
|-
! colspan="4" | Teens
|-
! 1
|March 14(Day 150)
|align="left" | Star HuntWhile staying in the camp, all of the housemates in both groups must find ten stars that represent the first ten main seasons of the show in order to have a weekly budget and to successfully enter in the House through a series of tasks given by Big Brother. They were given separate tasks for the groups to find out.Teams:
 : Dustine, Eslam, Gabb, Maxine, and Rob
 : Ashton, Don, Kai, Luke, Stef, and Tiff

| style="background:#FF6666;" | Failed
|-
! 2
| March 21(Day 157)
| align="left" | Basketball DanceThe housemates must create a basketball choreography wherein they will perform a dance and use a basketball at the same time. They must be able to perform five basketball tricks on their final performance. They are only allowed to make three mistakes. 
| style="background:#FF6666;" | Failed
|-
! 3
| March 29(Day 165)
| align="left" | Body Photo Mosaic MakingThe housemates must successfully mimic an image through a photo mosaic with 324 pieces of different photographs. That is, when the photos they are taking are set aside, can be successfully seen and correct. They can use any parts of their body to put and color them to help with the image that needs to be formed.
| style="background:#99FF66;" | Passed
|-
! 4
| April 4(Day 171)
| align="left" |  PBB UniversityServed as both a weekly task and a group challenge, the housemates were divided into two groups. They must compete with each other through tasks or "examinations" on different subjects that are taught at schools such as Language and Science.

The housemates in both groups must successfully create a boat made from different sizes of water bottles. Their boats must not sink and must hold multiple people when tested. If both groups are successful, they will be given their weekly budget, otherwise, if only one of the groups succeed, they will be given half of the budget, or none if both of the groups failed to successfully create a boat. They were given one week to complete this task.

See Group challenges for more information about this task.Teams:
 Team Dustine: Dustine (leader), Kai, Paolo, Rob, Stef, and Stephanie
 Team Luke: Luke (leader), Ashton, Eslam, Gabb, Maxine, and Tiff
| style="background:#99FF66;" | Passed
|-
! 5
| April 10(Day 177)
| align="left" | Tree of SacrificeUsing the big rocks that they have written earlier, the housemates must carry all of their rocks altogether on a tree for the entire week. Only six housemates at a time can carry the tree and they have an assigned carrying time; they must carry the tree for ten minutes each without attempting to lower the tree. They can only start when Big Brother gives them his signal. They are only allowed to make three attempts to lower the tree for the entire duration of this task.
| style="background:#99FF66;" | Passed
|-
! 6
| April 18(Day 185)
| align="left" | Past is PastAs a response to the widely criticized History Quiz Bee, the housemates were divided into two groups that was determined through its counterpart as a Head of Household challenge, the housemates in both groups must earn a "passing grade" of 15 out of 20 correct answers from two examinations; a surprise midterm and a final examination that will be given by Big Brother during the duration of the weekly task.Teams:
 Tour Group: Tiff (leader), Dustine, Gabb, Luke, and Maxine
 Museum Group: Eslam (leader), Ashton, Paolo, Rob, and Stephanie

| style="background:#99FF66;" | Passed
|-
! 7
| April 24(Day 191)
| align="left" | The Big KumuniTEEN Summer ConcertAll of the housemates must create a summer-themed concert throughout the week. They must create five performances on the said concert and must use the musical instruments provided by Big Brother. They must include one musical instrument on each of their performances. P-pop groups SB19 and MNL48 will serve as their mentors in singing and dancing respectively for this weekly task.

The concert will be judged alone by the Kumunity; this consists of a panel of 50 people selected by the management between April 25 to 27.

At the end of each performance, the Kumunity judging panel will judge their performances and will give a maximum of 50 diamonds to the housemates; each of them can give a diamond to a performance that they like. This will go on for all 6 of their performances; a total of 300 diamonds can be possibly given to the housemates.

The housemates must reach at least 250 diamonds or more at the end of all 6 performances in order to succeed in this weekly task and to give ₱100,000 to Bantay Bata: Children's Village, the seventh Kumunity beneficiary for this season.

| style="background:#99FF66;" | Passed
|-
! 8
| May 5(Day 202)
| align="left" | Plate Balancing TaskThe housemates must balance 200 plates that must be individually placed in five tables consisting of 40 thin poles each. All of the plates must not fall throughout the duration of the task and must stay put until the time runs out. They only have 100 minutes to complete this task.
| style="background:#FF6666;" | Failed
|-
! 9
| May 13(Day 210)
| align="left" | Paper Tower of Tibay (English: Paper Tower of Strength)The housemates must build a tower made out of paper in the activity area. They must walk around the pool area for 10 times to get the supplies needed for the weekly task. The housemates must make sure that the paper tower that they built must be at least 7-feet tall and must be sturdy while three diamonds are placed on top of their tower within 100 seconds.

The outcome of this weekly task will be the basis of the donation Big Brother will give to Sinag Kalinga Foundation, Inc., the eighth Kumunity beneficiary for this season.
| style="background:#99FF66;" | Passed
|-
!colspan="4" | Biga-10
|-
! 1
| May 18(Day 215)
| align="left" |  Baliktad-Bahay (English: Reversed House)The housemates must try to stack 72 pieces of colored blocks in the pool area. They must stack those blocks in reverse so that the blocks can be seen correctly as a reflection of the house can be seen in the bottom of the pool as their guide. They must use wooden sticks to transport the blocks into a platform in the middle of the pool.

One thousand pesos (₱1,000) will be added to the total donation to Science of Identity Foundation, Inc., the season's ninth Kumunity beneficiary for every block placed or one hundred thousand pesos (₱100,000) if all 72 blocks are placed at the end of the weekly task.
| style="background:#FF6666;" | Failed
|-
! 2
| May 22(Day 219)
| align="left" | Stacking Colored Tower CupsThe housemates must build four colored tower cups that represents the color of their respective Kumunity. They must build their respective colored tower cups and must work altogether on a fourth tower. They must only use their elbows in stacking their cups. A violation will be given if they are caught using their hands to pick their cups. Two Kumunities must work their tower at a time assigned by Big Brother at a location that was picked by the task leaders.

The housemates must make sure that by the end of the week, they must successfully move their tower cups to the activity area without falling and defend their respective towers against different ninjas at random times. They were then helped in constructing and defending their respective towers by the three ex-housemates (Eian, Laziz, and Luke).

The outcome of this weekly task will become the basis of the donation Big Brother will give to Feed Hungry Minds Library, Inc., the tenth and last Kumunity beneficiary of the season.
| style="background:#99FF66;" | Passed
|}

Notes

Celebrities
  A total of 21 game violations were earned during Kyle's turn to play the game. He was able to get 38 hits which gave him to earn a total of 17 tickets. For Alexa, she earned 22 hits while incurring 40 game violations. This gave her -18 tickets. KD, on the other hand, was able to make 33 hits while earning 24 game violations. He earned a total of 9 tickets. For the first round of the Soccer Arcade, all in all, they earned eight tickets.
  For the second round of the Soccer Arcade, Eian was able to make a total of -5 tickets from the 18 hits and the 23 game violations he had earned. For Jordan, he earned 27 hits while incurring only four game violations. This gave him 23 tickets. Shanaia, on the other hand, was able to make 22 hits while earning 9 game violations. She earned a total of 13 tickets. For the last game for this round, Anji was able to make 22 hits while earning 14 game violations; she earned a total of eight tickets. All in all, they earned 39 tickets.
  Kyle was selected not to participate since all the positions in the game were already filled.
  Shanaia was selected not to participate since all the positions in the game were already filled.
  Benedix and Shanaia were in the house when the task was performed. The episode for this task was aired on December 12, 2021. The celebrity housemates received the total average score of 89% from the judges.
Adults
  The adult housemates were informed by Big Brother that the result of this weekly task will be displayed on the plasma TV; if the face of Karlito, the tarsier mascot of Kumu, is happy, signifies success; if sad, signifies failure. After revealing the result by revealing each part of the picture, a sad Karlito was shown, meaning that they have failed this weekly task.
  Kathleen was elected as the last boss of their company the day after completing their third capital task; thus making her safe from the nominations. This was in connection to their secret weekly task given to them on Day 101, making Andrei and Roque the first two nominees of the first nominations.
  Aleck and Rica were in the house when the task was performed. The episode for this task was aired on February 13, 2022.
  To determine the result of their weekly budget, they were given an hour to insert all of the flowers they have created and earned during the task given to Aleck, Basti, Kathleen, and Rica; they have successfully placed all of the flowers in the big broken heart in one hour, therefore giving them their weekly budget.
  Basti and Jaye were in the house when the task was performed. The episode for this task was aired on February 19, 2022.
  To get the average score of 90%, the Kumunity must drop at least 840,000 diamonds on Kumu to get 84% of their total score. Every 10,000 diamonds dropped is equivalent to 1% of their score. In total, the Kumunity had only dropped 233,700 diamonds.
  Gin, Isabel, Kathleen, Roque, and Zach helped the other housemates' as another paramdam (feeling) in their weekly task. Since they have successfully transferred the pillars, they were given their weekly budget and were reunited with the other five housemates.
  Raf and Laziz along with the houseplayers Marky and Ja were in the house when the task was performed. The episode for this task was aired on March 7, 2022, one day after the fifth eviction night.
  At the end of the weekly task, the housemates have successfully transferred 940 balls; this was equivalent to ₱94,000. All of the proceeds will be donated to St. Arnold Janssen Kalinga Foundation, Inc., the said Kumunity beneficiary for the weekly task.
Teens
  The teen housemates have only collected nine stars at the end of the weekly task. Therefore, they have failed and were not given their weekly budget.
  As suggested by Big Brother himself, Don was exempt from performing due to his health condition.
  The housemates made four mistakes while performing the weekly task. They were made by Rob and Tiff with one mistake each, and Maxine with two mistakes; therefore, they were not given their weekly budget again.
  The housemates only received 50% of their weekly budget for the week as the task leaders, Dustine and Maxine, traded the other 50% for an extra advantage on the last 15 minutes of their weekly task as said by Big Brother.
  Kai was in the house when the task was performed. The episode for this task was aired on April 11, 2022, one day after the second eviction night.
  As punishment, the housemates must construct the remaining unclaimed musical instrument by themselves.
  Maxine still received her reward even though the housemates failed to shoot the seven remaining targets required to complete the task. The housemates would have to construct and paint the stage by themselves as another punishment for failing the challenge.
  As task leader, Paolo was excluded for this challenge to act as their lookout for the challenge along with the other members of SB19.
  This weekly task must be completed by the housemates in 24 hours after the housemates voted for "a weekly task valid for a day" in the voting asked by Big Brother.
Biga-10
  Even though the housemates failed in this weekly task, the housemates managed to place 30 blocks at the end of the weekly task; therefore giving thirty-thousand pesos (₱30,000) to Science of Identity Foundation, Inc.
  Anji was suggested by Big Brother to not participate in this weekly task due to her lower back pain.

Other tasks
Aside from the weekly tasks, the housemates including the houseguests if necessary were also given other significant tasks. These tasks usually involve rewards for someone special, some may include nomination or eviction twists as a consequence of failing such tasks, some were required to be done secretly, some may involve a combination of two or more types of tasks, or very difficult punishments.

Notes

Celebrities
  The remaining Big coins would be reused when Kyle and Chie entered the house, added 4,437.2 Big coins from their pre-entry ambagan tasks with the remaining balance as of Day 1, and shopped for more appliances on Day 5.
Adults
  On Basti's behalf, Jaye and Nathan helped give the seventh and eighth questions respectively.
Teens
  The teen housemates scored 0 points as they removed four white and black slippers during the game.
  Eslam and Luke were in the house before they were both evicted that same night. Team 2 won this game and was rewarded a halo-halo by Big Brother.
Biga-10
  Madam Inutz was in the house before she was evicted that same day. The Celebrities (Anji, Brenda, Madam Inutz, and Samantha) won this clash.
  Even though there were three groups for this task, no official group list was shown during the broadcast of the task. Still, the housemates completed this task and therefore won a foodcart.

K.E.A's tasks
K.E.A (short for Kuya's Executive Assistant) was introduced to the Teen housemates before Big Brother temporarily left the House shortly on Week 24. Unbeknownst to the Teen housemates, K.E.A was "hacked" by a "scammer" days later when a power outage occurred in the house. The "scammer" K.E.A then lured the housemates into giving them a reward for every secret reward task they complete. This gave the Teen housemates and the viewers a valuable lesson regarding on rising cases of social media fraud in the Philippines.

Challenges

 Head of Household
Every week, all of the housemates (excluding newly entered housemates) will compete to become the House's Head of Household. Those who win the title will be immune from the nominations and, therefore, cannot be evicted for that particular week. In an event of a tie, participants with the winning score or time will be both named as Head of Household. Just like the previous season, during each of the weekly challenges, the public may send padalucks or virtual Kumu gifts to their chosen housemate. The housemate with the most padalucks will get an advantage for the challenge.

{| class="wikitable" style="text-align:center; font-size:100%; line-height:18px;" width="100%"
|-
! style="width: 10%;" | Challenge No.
! style="width: 10%;" | Date given
! style="width: 70%;" | Challenge title and description
! style="width: 10%;" | Head of Household
|-
! colspan="4" | Celebrities
|-
! 1
| October 23(Day 8)
| align="left" | Battle for ImmunityWhile holding a large invitation card, each of the housemates must reach point B from point A by stepping onto a series of eight balance balls. If ever they fell from any of the balls, they will have to go back to point A and restart the challenge. The housemate with the fastest time wins the challenge.Padaluck recipient: Eian (7 balance balls to step on instead of 8)
| style="background:#CCFFCC;" | Brenda
|-
! 2
| November 7(Day 23)
| align="left" | School TripWhile wearing their school uniforms, each housemate must be able to memorize 6 items. They will only be allowed to start the challenge once the school bell rings. Once they will hear the bell, they will first have to gather all the books provided, place the books in a school bag, and carry the said bag while doing the challenge. Afterwards, they will then have to raise a flag in order to reveal 6 individual items; in case that they may forget the items or the correct order, they are allowed to raise the flag again. From a locker, they will then have to search for the said 6 items one by one and arrange them in the correct order. If they feel that they got the correct order, they may submit their answer by pressing the red button; a bell sound will be played if they got the correct answer. The housemate with fastest time to finish wins the challenge.Padaluck recipient: Eian (5 items required to memorize instead of 6)
| style="background:#CCFFCC;" | TJ
|-
! 3
|  November 14(Day 30)
| align="left" | Pinoy Small Brother HouseWithin 100 seconds and by only using a big pair of tongs, each of the housemates must stack tiny colored cylinders to a tiny pedestal placed in miniature model of the House's outdoor area. Each of the colored cylinder is equivalent to a certain point: 1 point for a blue cylinder, two points for a red cylinder, and three points for a yellow cylinder; only standing cylinders will be counted. The housemate(s) with the most number of points wins the challenge.Padaluck recipient: Eian (additional 20-second advantage from 100 seconds)
| style="background:#CCFFCC;" | Samantha
|-
! 4
|  November 27(Day 43)
| align="left" | Perfect Punch ChallengeEach housemate must punch a hanging punching bag in order for it to move towards the HOH mark. They are given five attempts to punch the bag. The housemate with the nearest distance to the HOH mark wins the challenge.Padaluck recipient: KD (additional two attempts from 5)
| style="background:#CCFFCC;" | Anji
|-
! colspan="4" |Adults
|-
!1
|January 9(Day 85)
| align="left" |Using a remote controller, each housemate must navigate a drone through an obstacle course consisting of a set of four hoops of varying sizes and heights, and of a tunnel. The housemate that can land their drone at the end point at the fastest time wins the challenge.Padaluck recipient: Isabel (decreased to three hoops)
| style="background:#CCFFCC;" | Nathan
|-
! 2
|February 13(Day 121)
| align="left" |Using any parts of their body (except for their hands), each housemate must transfer a ball through cylindrical obstacle course without falling it. If ever they fell a ball, they will go back to the starting point. The housemate with the fastest time to finish, wins the challenge.
| style="background:#CCFFCC;" | 
|-
! colspan="4" |Teens
|-
! 1
|March 26(Day 162)
| align="left" |Each housemate must transfer two CDs that is inserted on a slinky and must move it to the end of the slinky by only using their body. The housemate that transfers both of the CDs at the fastest time wins the challenge.Padaluck recipient: Stef (first to create time to beat)
| style="background:#CCFFCC;" | Maxine
|-
! 2
|April 4(Day 171)
| align="left" |The housemates must imitate the three positions displayed on a blackboard while laying flat on the floor and holding a book on their foot. They must start again from the beginning if ever the book falls. When finished, they must stand on a stair and make a bow to stop their time. The housemate that does this in the fastest time wins the challenge.Padaluck recipient: Paolo (one minute was added to his time to beat)
| style="background:#CCFFCC;" | Stef
|-
! 3
|April 17(Day 184) 
| align="left" |History Picture Quiz Bee A deviation of the widely criticized History Quiz Bee, the housemates must guess the pictures displayed by Big Brother on the plasma TV. The first housemate to answer five questions correctly wins the challenge.
| style="background:#CCFFCC;" | Tiff
|}

Notes

Celebrities
 Jordan was exempt from performing this challenge as he entered the house four days before the second nomination proceedings.
 Kyle participated in this challenge before being evicted on the same night. As the result of this challenge was presented on Day 44, Kyle's name and final length were excluded from the leaderboard.
Adults
 No Padaluck campaign was held on Kumu for this challenge—as of this date, the reason for this is still unknown. Zach was the first housemate to do this challenge as he was chosen by users through Kumunity Decides.
Teens
 Stef participated in this challenge before being evicted on the same night. If she was saved from eviction, she would be with the Museum Group for the upcoming Past is Past weekly task.
 No Padaluck recipient and campaign was held on Kumu for this challenge to ensure fairness for all the housemates.

Ligtask
The Ligtask challenge, carried over from previous seasons, were usually held in lieu of the Heads of Household challenge.

Notes

  As part of a twist, the first two housemates to do this challenge will be saved instead of five.
  Even though only Laziz and Michael Ver were saved from this eviction as per the announcement by Big Brother, Isabel, Kathleen, and Roque were also saved from eviction as they have also successfully shot their balls on the container as part of the original rules before the twist occurred.
  The number of evictees for this task was never revealed as the three of them did not finish the challenge in time. Therefore, they were "evicted" from the house.

Group challenges
Just like in previous seasons, in the housemates were split in multiple teams to compete for immunity on multiple occasions.

{| class="wikitable" style="text-align:center; font-size:100%; line-height:18px;" width="100%"
|-
! style="width: 10%;" | Challenge No.
! style="width: 10%;" | Date given
! style="width: 60%;" | Challenge title and description
! style="width: 10%;" | Winner
! style="width: 10%;" | Loser(s)
|-
! colspan="5" |Celebrities
|-
! 1
| November 14(Day 30)
| align="left" | Pinoy Big Brother Games 2021Alyssa, Benedix and Jordan were informed that the housemates will participate in the Pinoy Big Brother Games wherein the housemates, in groups of five, will compete for points in a series of games with the group earning the most points winning immunity for the next nomination round. The three were also assigned as leaders for their respective five person teams. To determine which team will the housemates be part of, except for the team captains, all of the housemates were tasked to do a series of physical challenge to complete: 100 jumping jacks, 50 squats, and 30 burpees. After finishing all the exercises, the housemate to finish first will then have to get their corresponding rank badge; the others will also have to follow suit according to their rank. The rank badge will determine their order of when they will have to choose their teams of choice. After the first ranking housemate had chosen his or her team, the next in rank will then follow.Teams: Phenomenal Altos: Alyssa (captain), Alexa, Chie, KD and Kyle
 Bigateam: Benedix (captain), Brenda, Eian, Karen and TJ
 Jordan's Angels: Jordan (captain), Anji, Madam Inutz, Samantha and Shanaia

| style="background:#FBF373;" | Bigateam
| style="background:#FA8072;" | Phenomenal Altos,Jordan's Angels
|-
! 2
| November 29(Day 45)
| align="left" | Tower TaskEach two groups of the divided House were given a task to create a tower made of blocks. The blocks will be taken from a platform placed at the center of pool. Since these blocks were not divided equally, each of the groups will have to take all the blocks that they can get using only  panungkit or improvised poles that they will have to make. They will only have 20 minutes to get as many blocks as they could have.

At the end of the week, the group that will be able to make the highest standing block tower will win immunity, while the losing group will be the ones who will be nominated for the next nominations.Teams: Yellow Team: Anji, Brenda, KD, Benedix, Madam Inutz, Samantha and Shanaia
 Blue Team: Alyssa, Alexa, Jordan, TJ, Karen and Eian

| style="background:#FBF373;" | Blue Team
| style="background:#FA8072;" | Yellow Team
|-
! colspan="5" |Adults
|-
!1
| January 31(Day 108)
| align="left" | Battle of the DuosThe housemates were informed that the house was split into two, it was also announced that the two pairs of leaders of their respective groups were related to each other; the two pairs of leaders being Raf and Nathan as Team Juane, and Basti and Jaye as Team Macaraan. The winning group at the end of this challenge will be given immunity; with the other group being the possible nominees for the second nominations.

In order to determine the members of each group, first, the remaining housemates will pick a random number from a bowl; the housemates who picked the first numbers will then select their pair. Then, in the activity area, the two pairs of leaders must inflate a balloon and then pass it to a basket by using their heads. The two housemates standing on a podium will then belong to the winning pair.

As the Macaraan Brothers have won the first three rounds, the remaining housemates (Isabel, Kathleen, Rica, Seham, Thamara, and Zach) were automatically assigned to Team Juane.Teams: Team Juane: Raf and Nathan (captains), Isabel, Kathleen, Rica, Seham, Thamara, and Zach
 Team Macaraan: Basti and Jaye (captains), Andrei, Aleck, Gin, Laziz, Michael Ver, and Roque

{| class="wikitable collapsible collapsed" style="text-align: center; font-size:90%; line-height:17px;" width="100%"
|-
|+The group challenges
|-
! style="width: 10%;" | Challenge No.
! style="width: 10%;" | Date given
! style="width: 50%;" | Challenge title and description
! style="background:#FFFFFF; width:15%;" | Team Juane
! style="background:#000000; color:white; width:15%;" | Team Macaraan
|-
! 1
| Feb. 2(Day 110)
| align="left" | Home Along Da Riles (English: Home Along the Rails)In every group, four housemates in pairs of two must ride into a cart using only their body movement in order to move the cart. Once they reach into a row of keys, a housemate must get a key and a plunger to help them go back faster and unlock a lock from a box that has six locks that contains an immunity necklace. The two members of a pair will get a key separately, and then both of the pair will get another key together. 
The group who unlocks their respective box first wins this round.
|style="background:#FBF373;"|Won|style="background:#FA8072;"|Lost
|-
! 2
| Feb. 3(Day 111)
| align="left" | Goal BoalSimilar to the Paralympic sport goalball, while wearing safety gear and eyepatches, the remaining pair of each group that did not participate on the first challenge must catch the ball of the other pair with the first pair lying on the floor and the other pair standing.
The pair standing must roll the ball into the floor, and the other pair must catch the ball using their hands. Points ranging from 2-3 points will be given to the standing pair if the other pair fails to catch the ball in one of the three areas of the other pairs' goal area. There will be two rounds that consists of two 10-minute half-times, for a total of 20 minutes for the pairs to play with.

The group pair with the most points garnered during the game wins this round.
|style="background:#FA8072;"|Lost
|style="background:#FBF373;"|Won|-
!colspan="3"|Final score
|style="background:#FA8072;"|16
|style="background:#FBF373;"|20|}

The winner for the group challenge was in favor for Team Macaraan for winning the tiebreaker in the second challenge.

|rowspan="2" style="background:#FBF373;"|Jaye, and Roque
|rowspan="2" style="background:#FA8072;"|Aleck, Basti, Gin, Laziz, and Team Juane
|-
! 2
| February 4–5(Days 112-113)
|align="left" | Plot TwistAs a twist, Big Brother informed the members of Team Macaraan that they have not claimed their immunity yet. He then gave a plot-twisting challenge to determine the final winners of the Battle of the Duos, and to also finally determine the possible nominees for the second nominations.

To test their strategies, creativity, and patience, all of the members of Team Macaraan must stack a tower of blocks within 30 minutes. They were allowed to create the mechanics for their respective games against each other. At the end of all games, only four winners of their respective games against each other will then be given immunity for the second nominations, making the other four vulnerable for eviction.

At the end of the group challenge, only Andrei, Jaye, Michael Ver, and Roque of Team Macaraan have claimed immunity for the second nominations; leaving their fellow team members Aleck, Basti, Gin, and Laziz, along with the members of Team Juane vulnerable for eviction.

Although Andrei won his battle against Aleck, he was evicted prior to the second nomination night, which rendered his immunity void.
|-
! colspan="5"| Teens
|-
! 1
| April 4(Day 171)
| align="left" |  PBB UniversityServed as both a weekly task and a group challenge, the housemates were divided into two groups. They must compete with each other through a series of tasks or "examinations" through different subjects that are taught at schools such as Language and Science.Teams:
 : Dustine (leader), Kai, Paolo, Rob, Stef, and Stephanie
 : Luke (leader), Ashton, Eslam, Gabb, Maxine, and Tiff

|style="background:#FBF373;"|Team Luke
|style="background:#FA8072;"|Team Dustine
|}

The Ten Million Diamonds Challenge
At the Final Five of each batch, the housemates will face a number of challenges to earn themselves an amount of diamonds they may add to the diamond total of a housemate of their choice.

The Ten Million Diamonds Group Challenge
A special variation of the challenge was featured during the Teen edition featured the Teen housemates competing against a group of Teen houseplayers to gain a portion of the ten million diamonds given by Big Brother. They must defend their diamonds against the houseplayers to earn a bigger portion of the diamonds.

Final Five spot challenges
The Adult and Teen editions featured the housemates competing against each other for a spot in the Final Five of their Kumunity instead of the open voting that was made throughout the previous editions. The housemates must defend their respective spots as the other housemates and the houseplayers (for the Adults) can possibly snatch their spots if they fail a challenge given by Big Brother. They must make sure that they must defend their spots throughout the entire week before Big Brother announces the final members of the Final Five of their respective Kumunities.

An italicized name means that the participant is a houseplayer.

Comeback challenges
As a major twist of the season, four out of the six comeback housemates will compete for four wildcard slots to complete the Biga-10 Housemates through a series of challenges given by Big Brother. The first two will be occupied by the comeback housemates of a Kumunity on a Kumu campaign, while the remaining two will be determined through challenges. The housemates that lost a challenge will then be evicted (except for the first challenge).

{| class="wikitable" style="text-align:center; font-size:100%; line-height:18px;" width="100%"
|-
! style="width: 10%;" | Challenge No.
! style="width: 10%;" | Date given
! style="width: 60%;" | Challenge title and description
! style="width: 10%;" | Winner/s
! style="width: 10%;" | Loser/s
|-
! colspan="5" | Biga-10
|-
! 1
| May 15(Day 212)
| align="left" | Biga-10 Comeback CampaignThe comeback housemates of each Kumunity will host their respective livestreams on Kumu at the same time as scheduled by Big Brother. Viewers can send virtual gifts to a Kumunity of their choice throughout the duration of their respective live streams. Only 25 virtual gifts will be accepted per account per day.

The campaign will run from May 15 to 17, 2022. The Kumunity that places first at the end of the campaign on May 17 will get the seventh and eighth spot of the Biga-10 Housemates.

| style="background:#FBF373" | Zach(Adult Kumunity)
| style="background:#c0c0c0" |Brenda(Celebrity Kumunity)MaxineStephanie(Teen Kumunity)
|-
! 2
| rowspan="2"|May 20(Day 217)
| align="left" | Teen comeback housemates Maxine and Stephanie must race to form a puzzle in the activity area. First, they must unlock a box that has three locks that has the keys randomly placed in their respective stations. They must walk through a thin platform to unlock the keys and select another key. Once finished, they must proceed to the next station where they must roll their assigned colored ball into a wide pachinko board that will become their timer in assembling their puzzles. They must then assemble a puzzle while their ball falls down to the end of the board. They will be given a one-minute penalty if their ball falls on the ground while they are assembling their puzzles.

The housemate that assembles their puzzle first will then gain the ninth Biga-10 spot while the other housemate that fails to do so will be re-evicted.
| style="background:#FBF373" |Stephanie| style="background:#FA8072" |Maxine|-
! 3
| align="left" | Celebrity comeback housemates Brenda and Madam Inutz must try to place six balls first on six specified targets named B, I, G, A, 1, and 0 placed on a runway. They must exactly place the balls in their specific position starting from the farthest to the nearest by rolling it in the runway. Once they place a ball in a specific target, they can then start rolling the next ball to the next target. The ball will only be counted if it reaches a specific target, whether it may be a little near or far from its position. It will not be counted if it goes far or completely falls on the runway.

The housemate that successfully places all six balls first will then gain the tenth and final Biga-10 spot and the other housemate that fails to do so will be re-evicted.
| style="background:#FBF373" |Brenda| style="background:#FA8072" |Madam Inutz|}

Kumuni-Test
To determine this season's Ultimate Big 5, each Kumunity will compete in a three-part challenge referred to as the KumuniTest. In each challenge, a certain amount of points are put at stake; the winners of the first round will receive 25 points, the winners of the second round will receive 50 points and the winners of the final round will receive 75 points. More challenges may be implemented if there is ever a tie between the scores of two or more Kumunities. The Kumunity with the most points at the end of the challenges will automatically be part of the Big 5.

Notes

  Isabel was exempted from participating in this challenge as the Adults have four members and the challenge only needs three participating members.
  Zach was exempted from participating in this challenge as the Adults have four members and the challenge only needs three participating members.
  The Celebrities won the tiebreaker round, therefore their Kumunity secured the three out of five spots of the Ultimate Big 5. The remaining two spots would then be occupied by one housemate of the Adult and Teen Kumunities through open voting.

Nomination history
In each standard nomination round, every housemate is called to the confession room to nominate two of their housemates for eviction, with the first nominee receiving two points and the other receiving 1 point. The housemates with the most nomination points, usually 3, will then face the public vote to determine the evictee for that round. However, Big Brother may automatically nominate a housemate for rule violations or a failure in a task. On the other hand, immunity may be awarded as a reward for accomplishing a task. Big Brother may forcibly evict a housemate for severe violations, and a housemate may opt to voluntarily leave the house. In certain circumstances, the nomination process may be delayed as a result of a pending challenge or task. For the purposes of uniformity with the other previous season articles, the launch night is marked as Day 1, not the day after it.

Celebrities
<div style="overflow:auto; padding:4px;">
{| class="wikitable" style="width:25%; text-align:center; font-size:90%; line-height:16px;"
! width="5%" |
! width="9%" | #1
! width="9%" | #2
! width="9%" | #3
! width="9%" | #4
! width="9%" | #5
! width="9%" | #6
! width="9%" | #7
! width="9%" | #8
! width="9%" | #9
! width="9%" | Top 2
!Biga-10 Pasabog
! width="5%" rowspan="3" | NominationsReceived
|-
! Eviction Dayand Date
! Day 22
! Day 29
! Day 36
! Day 43
! Day 51
! Day 57
! Day 64
! Day 71
! Day 77
! Day 78
! —
|-
! Nomination 
| Day 16
| Day 23
| Day 30
| Day 37
| Day 44
| Day 52
| Day 58
| Day 66
| Day 73
| colspan="2" | —
|-style="border-top: 4px solid;"
! Anji
| KarenJohn
| KDAlbie
| AlexaBenedix 
| AlexaKyle
| style="background:#CCFFCC;" | AlexaKD
| style="background:#959FFD;" | Nonominations
| BrendaEian
| 
| style="background:#C0C0C0;" | Nonominations
| colspan="2" style="background:#FBF373;" | | 25
|-
! Samantha
| ChieKyle
| AnjiAlexa
| style="background:#CCFFCC;"| BenedixTJ
| JordanKyle
| TJKaren
| style="background:#959FFD;" | Nonominations
| AlexaEian
| 
| style="background:#C0C0C0;" | Nonominations
| style="background:#FA8072;" | Evicted(Day 77)
| style="background:#FBF373;" || 5
|-
! Alyssa
| JohnShanaia
| KDAlbie
| ChieKaren
| AnjiKD
| KarenKD
|style="background:#FBF373;" |  Nonominations
| AlexaKD
| 
| style="background:#C0C0C0;" | Nonominations
| style="background:#FBF373;" | | style="background:#FFCCFF;" |
| 3
|-
! 
| KDKaren
| AlbieKD
| style="background:#CCFFCC;"| ChieKyle
| AnjiKyle
| AlexaKD
| style="background:#959FFD;" | Nonominations
| style="background:#FBF373;" | AlexaAnji
| 
| style="background:#C0C0C0;" | Nonominations
| colspan="2" style="background:#FA8072" | Evicted
| 1
|-
! Brenda
| style="background:#CCFFCC;" | JohnAlexa
| AlbieKD
| AlexaKD
| style="background:#FBF373;" | KyleJordan
| AlexaTJ
| style="background:#C2D5E8;" | Nonominations
| KDAlexa
| 
| style="background:#C0C0C0;" | Nonominations
| colspan="2" style="background:#FA8072" | Evicted
| 10
|-
! Alexa
| JohnShanaia
| AlbieAnji
| AnjiBrenda
| AnjiJordan
| BenedixSamantha
| style="background:#FBF373;" | Nonominations
| JordanBrenda
| 
| colspan="3" style="background:#FA8072" | Evicted
| 36
|-
! KD
| KarenJohn
| AlbieKaren
| BrendaKaren
| KyleJordan
| KarenBrenda
| style="background:#959FFD;" | Nonominations
| BrendaEian
| 
| colspan="3" style="background:#FA8072" | Evicted
| 37
|-
! Jordan
| style="background:white" | Not in
| style="background:#FBF373;" | Exempt
| KyleChie
| AlexaKD
| SamanthaAlexa
| style="background:#FBF373;" | Nonominations
| AlexaAnji
| colspan="4" style="background:#FA8072" | Evicted(Day 65) 
| 8
|-
! Eian
| TJAnji
| KDShanaia
| KDShanaia
| style="background:#FBF373;" | AnjiJordan
| TJKaren
| style="background:#FBF373;" | Nonominations
| KDAnji
| colspan="4" style="background:#FA8072" | Evicted(Day 65) 
| 9
|-
! Shanaia
| ChieAlyssa
| AlbieAlexa
| EianKyle
| KyleAlexa
| KarenBenedix
| style="background:#959FFD;" | Nonominations
| colspan="5" style="background:#FA8072" | Evicted(Day 57) 
| 7
|-
! Benedix
| style="background:white" | Not in
| AlbieAnji
| KDAnji
| style="background:#FBF373;" | KyleAnji
| TJAlexa
| style="background:#959FFD;" | Nonominations
| colspan="5" style="background:#FA8072" | Evicted(Day 57) 
| 10
|-
! Karen
| KDAnji
| AlbieKD
| ChieBrenda
| style="background:#FBF373;" | KyleShanaia
| Alyssa
| colspan="6" style="background:#FA8072" | Evicted(Day 51)
| 18
|-
! TJ
| AnjiJohn
| style="background:#CCFFCC;"| KDAlexa
| KDEian
| style="background:#FBF373;" | AlexaKD
| SamanthaKaren
| colspan="6" style="background:#FA8072" | Evicted(Day 51)
| 10
|- Brenda
! Kyle
| ShanaiaJohn
| BenedixAlbie
| EianKD
| AnjiKD
| colspan="7" style="background:#FA8072" | Evicted(Day 43)
| 20
|-
! Chie
| AlexaJohn
| AlbieAlexa
| BenedixKaren
| colspan="8" style="background:#FA8072" | Evicted(Day 36)
| 11
|-
! Albie
| style="background:#FBF373;" | Exempt
| KyleEian
| colspan="9" style="background:#FA8072" | Evicted(Day 29)
| 19
|-
! John
| KDAlexa
| colspan="10" style="background:#FA8072" | Evicted(Day 22)
| 11
|-style="border-top: 4px solid;"
! Notes
| 
| 
| 
| 
| 
|   
|    
|   
| colspan="2" | 
| 
| rowspan="10" style="background:#CCCCCC" |
|- style="background:#CCFFCC;"
! Head(s) ofHousehold
| Brenda
| TJ
| Samantha
| 
| Anji
| colspan="3" 
| colspan="2" rowspan="2" style="background:#F8F9FA" | Challenge Score + Open Voting
|rowspan="2" style="background:#F8F9FA" | Open Voting Closed
|-
! Up for eviction
| JohnKarenKD
| AlbieAlexaAnjiKD
| BenedixChieEianKD
| AlexaAnjiKyle
| AlexaKarenSamanthaTJ
| AnjiBenedixBrendaKDSamanthaShanaia
| AlexaAnjiBrendaEianJordanKD
| AlexaAnjiKDSamantha
|-
! Saved from eviction
| KD45.04%Karen18.44%
| Alexa17.09% KD16.08% Anji8.46%
| KD17.35% Benedix16.83% Eian12.12%
| Anji30.03%Alexa27.98%
| Alexa36.95%Samantha28.03%
| Brenda17.54%Anji16.50%KD15.57%Samantha14.32%
| Anji19.28%KD18.22%Alexa17.60%Brenda15.51% 
| Anji19.18%18.92%Samantha17.98%
| colspan="2" style="background:#FBF373;" | Alyssa22.63%Anji13.60%
| style="background:#FBF373;| SamanthaRecipient of Alyssa's Spot
|-style="background:#FA8072"
! Evicted
| John0.30%
| Albie6.48%
| Chie11.16%
| Kyle22.25%
| Karen16.42%TJ-3.05%
| Shanaia13.02%Benedix8.66%
| Jordan4.53%Eian2.72%
| Alexa17.03%KD16.99%
| colspan="2" | Samantha13.53%Madam Inutz13.03%Brenda2.84%
| style="background:#c0c0c0;" |No eviction|- style="background:#FFCCFF;" 
! 
| colspan="10" 
|Alyssa
|-
! References
| 
| 
| 
| 
| 
|  
|  
| 
| colspan="2" | 
| 
|-
|}</div>

Legend
  Housemate received immunity after becoming a Head of Household.
  Housemate received immunity after winning or finishing a task or challenge; or was exempt from the nominations due to being a new entrant.
  Housemate was automatically nominated as a result of a twist or a rule violation.
  Housemate was up for eviction but was removed from the list of nominated housemates after being saved by another housemate or by oneself.
  Housemate received positive nomination points from another housemate.

Notes

  Albie was exempt from the nominations for being a new entrant. He entered the House on Day 12, four days before the first nomination night.
  Jordan was exempt from the nominations for being a new entrant. He entered the House on Day 19, four days before the second nomination night.
  Madam Inutz and Samantha both became the Heads of Household for the week after they tied in the challenge.
  The group consisting of Benedix, Brenda, Eian, Karen and TJ won immunity after earning the most points in the Pinoy Big Brother Games 2021.
  This eviction is a double eviction wherein two nominees were evicted.
  The nominations for the sixth eviction was determined via a challenge between Yellow Team (Anji, Brenda, KD, Benedix, Madam Inutz, Samantha and Shanaia) and the Blue Team (Alyssa, Alexa, Jordan, TJ, Karen and Eian) wherein the Blue Team won and was declared safe. As nominees from the prior nominations, Alexa, Karen, and TJ may only be safe for this round of nominations if they were to be saved in the fifth eviction night.
  Brenda used the Power to Save he won on Day 9 on herself for this round of nominations, removing himself from the list of nominees for that week.
  For this week, the housemates had a face to face nomination unlike the previous nomination rounds.
  Madam Inutz used her Nomination Immunity Pass for this round, giving her immunity for this week.
  This nomination week is similar to All In season's All In nominations, wherein all housemates who received votes were up for eviction.
  This nomination round had a positive nomination unlike the previous nomination rounds.
  Alyssa and Brenda both became safe from nomination after they tied the most positive nomination points.
  This week was the Final 5 week. The housemates competed for extra votes alongside the regular voting through the 10 Million Diamonds Challenge with the two housemates with the most total votes being named as their batch's Top 2. As a result, this week also featured a triple eviction.
  On Day 197, it was announced that Alyssa would be relinquishing her spot on the Top 2. As a result, Samantha was named her replacement by virtue of having the next most votes.

Powers
On Day 16, as a reward for receiving the most diamonds in the ambagan task held prior to the season, Alexa, Brenda and Eian were given powers. These powers can be used once at any point during their stay in the house until the seventh nomination night wherein the powers were nullified if left unused. The powers were given at random via covered stars; the recipient removed the covering to receive the power. For Alexa, she was given the Power to Automatically Nominate, which gave her the power to automatically nominate a housemate of their choice for eviction; this power can be used during the nominations. However, after being left unused in the seventh nominations, the power was nullified as there were no more rounds of nominations left to use it. For Brenda, he was given the Power to Save, which gave him the power to automatically save any nominee (including himself) from eviction; this power can be used after the list of nominees have been revealed. Brenda used his power on himself after being nominated in the sixth round of nominations, saving him from the eviction that week. For Eian, he was given the Power to Contact Someone From the Outside World. This power granted him the power to contact a loved one via a Kumu Livestream. Eian used the said power on Day 53 after he held a livestream.

In addition, for winning the Follower Sprint task held prior to the season, Madam Inutz was also awarded a Nomination Immunity Pass on Day 23. This pass granted her the power to give herself immunity for a nomination round of her choice; this power can be used before she decides to name her two nominees. Madam Inutz used her power for the seventh round of nominations, guaranteeing her another week in the house by awarding herself immunity.

Adults

Legend
  Housemate received immunity after becoming a Head of Household.
  Housemate received immunity after winning or finishing a task or challenge; or was exempt from the nominations due to being a new entrant.
  Housemate received immunity after winning the Ligtask challenge.
  Housemate was automatically nominated as a result of a twist or a rule violation.

Notes

  For being elected as the last boss of their company for their weekly task, Kathleen was awarded immunity for this eviction.
  As both Andrei and Roque failed to be elected as the boss of their company, thus failing in their weekly task resulting in their automatic nominations. Since there are two housemates that were both automatically nominated, only the highest-pointer will be included from the list of nominees for this week.
  This eviction is a double eviction wherein two nominees are set to be evicted.
  Andrei, Jaye, Michael Ver, and Roque won immunity after winning the twist given by Big Brother as part of the Battle of the Duos challenge. As nominees from the prior nominations, Andrei and Roque may only be safe for this round of nominations if they were to be saved in the first eviction night.
  Isabel used her Nomination Immunity Pass for this round, giving her immunity for this week.
  For this week, the housemates had a face to face nomination unlike the previous nomination rounds.
  This nomination round was divided into two groups; Team GinWin and Team RoQueens from the PBB Drag Race weekly task. Each housemate must be nominate a fellow member of their team.
  Nathan used his Nomination Immunity Pass for this round, giving him immunity for this week.
  This eviction is a triple eviction wherein three nominees are set to be evicted.
  Since almost all of them had left during the special nomination process, as the housemates that still stayed in the activity area after Big Brother announced his offer, Michael Ver and Nathan claimed the first two spots of the Final Five.
  Even though there was a special nomination process in this round of nominations, all nominations given there were declared void. 
  Seham was exempt for this eviction after she claimed the third Final Five spot.
  Isabel, Laziz, Raf, and Zach were given an automatic nomination after they failed to claim the third spot of the Final Five that was based on the task given to them by Big Brother.

Powers
On Day 93, Nathan and Raf were awarded one Nomination Immunity Pass as a reward for succeeding in their secret weekly task with the siblings themselves deciding whom between the two will receive the pass. They chose to give the pass to Nathan. Nathan used his power on the fourth round of nominations, guaranteeing him another week in the house by giving himself immunity.

On Day 113, Isabel was also awarded one Nomination Immunity Pass for having the most number of followers among her fellow housemates during their Follower Sprint task that was held from January 22 to February 4, 2022. Isabel used her power on the third round of nominations, guaranteeing her another week in the house by giving herself immunity.

Special nomination process
A special nomination process occurred on Day 134, which was a deviation from the regular nominations in the confession room and from the normal face-to-face nominations.

For each housemate to nominate their fellow housemate for eviction, the housemate must nominate another housemate and then explain their reason why they nominated such housemate. Then, the housemate must place their picture into a holder that has a number of nomination points displayed on it. For the nomination to be considered valid, the housemate must need to bounce a ball from the six platforms provided to a container that depends on the number of nomination points that can be found below the platform. The housemate will then do the same task for the other point. Once the nominating housemate has successfully placed a ball in one or all of the containers, the nominated housemate will be given the nomination point assigned; a necklace bearing the point received will also be worn by the nominated housemate. If a housemate fails to place a ball in one or both of the containers on a round, the housemate must repeat the process again until all the balls in the container will be used. The two (or more of there is a tie) highest pointers after three rounds or more until it is determined will then be considered as the final nominees for eviction.

On the second round, Big Brother noticed that they were not taking the task seriously; so, he made an offer to the housemates: to either stay in the Activity Area if they want to proceed to the next round, or leave if they don't want to. This offer tested the housemates' authenticity towards their fellow housemates.

As the housemates that remained in the Activity Area after Big Brother announced his offer to the housemates, Nathan and Michael Ver secured their spots on the Final Five of their Kumunity.

Legend
 Housemate became part of the Final Five of their Kumunity.
 Housemate has finished shooting all of the balls in all of the containers and made their nominations valid.
 Housemate failed to shoot a ball in all of the containers in that round and made their nominations invalid.

For housemates that only placed one ball during a round:
 name means that a ball was placed in the housemates' chosen container, making their nomination valid.
 means that no ball was placed in the housemates' chosen container, making their nomination invalid.

Teens

Legend
  Housemate received immunity after becoming a Head of Household.
  Housemate received immunity after winning or finishing a task or challenge
  Housemate was automatically nominated as a result of a loss in a challenge.

Notes

   For winning the PBB University group challenge, Team Luke, consisting of its namesake, Ashton, Eslam, Gabb, Maxine, and Tiff were awarded immunity for the week. On the other hand, Team Dustine, consisting of its namesake, Paolo, Rob, Stef, and Stephanie decided that week's nominees.
  For this week, the housemates had a face to face nomination unlike the previous nomination rounds.
  Gabb gave her Nomination Immunity Pass to Paolo, giving him immunity for this week's nomination.
  Maxine and Rob won immunity after winning the most Vote to Save face-to-face nomination.
  This eviction is a double eviction wherein two nominees are set to be evicted.
  Paolo and Gabb secured their first two Final Five slot after defending their spot to Tiff and Dustine, the challengers.
  Rob and Gabb did not leave the house. They will be joined by the Top 2 of each batch. 
  Stephanie and Maxine did not leave on Day 210. As the next two highest voters, they were the comeback housemates in the teen batch.

Powers
On Day 162, Gabb was awarded a Nomination Immunity Pass for having the most number of followers among her fellow housemates during their Follower Sprint task that was held from March 22 to 25, 2022. On the fifth round of nominations, Gabb gave her Nomination Immunity Pass to Paolo, guaranteeing him another week in the house by giving himself immunity.

Special Nomination Processes
Prior to the fifth nominations, the housemates observed two special nomination processes which granted immunity to the winners of each process.

 Yellow Discs 
For this process, each housemate is given five yellow discs, each representing a positive nomination point. A housemate may choose to award each disc to a housemate of their choice (including themselves) by shooting each disc into that particular housemate's container. A point will be considered valid should its corresponding disc land on their intended container, otherwise it would be invalidated.

The housemate(s) with the highest number of discs inserted in their respective containers will then be granted immunity from that week's nomination. The remaining housemates will then move to another round of nomination. As Ashton was evicted from the house prior to the nominations, any points he had received were invalidated.

Legend
 Housemate successfully shoots the disc in the chosen housemates' container.
 Housemate failed to shoot the disc in the chosen housemates' container.
Underlined name denotes a vote intended to be cast for oneself.

 Red Discs 
Following Ashton's eviction, the housemates had their fifth nominations, in which each housemate's nominations were cast publicly. In this process, each housemate is given three red discs, each representing a nomination point. Each housemate, including those made immune by the Yellow Disc challenge were obligated to nominate two housemates by placing discs on the housemates they chose to nominate for eviction, with the first nominee receiving two discs and the second receiving one disc. The housemates with the least discs would be saved from nominations, with the rest being nominated for that week.

Biga-10 
The final batch of the season saw the top twos of each batch return to the house. The Kumunity of each housemate is reflected by the colors (  - Celebrities,  - Adults,  - Teens).

Legend
  Housemate was part of the winning team in the Kumuni-Test.
  Housemate was part of the losing Kumunities in the Kumuni-Test and was automatically put up for eviction.
  An evictee from a past edition was invited to compete to return for a slot in the merged edition.
Notes

   The comeback housemates in each Kumunity competed in a campaign to determine the holders of the seventh and eighth spots in the Biga-10.
  The remaining comeback housemates in each Kumunity competed against each other to determine the holders of the final spots in the Biga-10. The first Kumunity to compete were the Teens, who were then followed by the Celebrities.
  The Biga10 housemates are competing in a series of competitions referred to as the KumuniTest to determine this season's Ultimate Big 5. The Kumunity with the most points at the end of the KumuniTests will automatically be part of the Big 5. The losing Kumunities will face the public vote to determine the fourth and fifth members of the Big 5.
  This eviction is a mass eviction wherein four or more nominees are set to be evicted.

S-E voting system result

As with the previous season, the public may vote to save or to evict a nominee with the votes to save and votes to evict being tallied in one list. The votes to save are then subtracted by the votes to evict. The nominee with the lowest percentage of votes regardless of the individual results in either category will be evicted. The public can vote once per day via both SMS and Kumu, with each vote in each platform representing 1 and 10 votes respectively. However, for the last 48 hours before the voting lines will be closed, the public is given unlimited chances to vote. This twist was initially limited to Kumu voters during the second eviction week, but was later extended also to SMS votes for the third and other succeeding eviction weeks.

For the celebrities, in determining for the Top 2, the voting process was again changed. Voting was restricted to one SMS vote for each of the kind of vote (to save or to evict) per SIM, per day. For Kumu votes, it was restricted to 10 votes for each kind of vote per account, per day. The public voting, however, was not the sole factor in determining the Top 2 as the remaining housemates had to earn diamonds through a series of challenges. These diamonds were then added to the public's votes.

For the adults and teens up until the Big Night, voting was exclusive to Kumu users only. Texting lines were not used for an undisclosed reason. Voting was still restricted to 10 votes for each kind of vote per account, per day.

The number of virtual gifts viewers can send for any type of vote was increased to 25 during the Biga-10 batch, up from the normal 10 during prior evictions. This was utilized throughout the open voting sessions for the Big 5 and the Big Winner. Nonetheless, texting lines were not employed in the last batch.

A leaderboard for every voting is displayed on Kumu for the public to see the tally of the nominated housemates' diamonds for every kind of vote. The nominees' names were anonymous starting from the celebrities, until the names of the nominees were revealed during the first nominations of the adults, until it went back again from anonymous starting from the second to the fourth nominations. The leaderboard was completely hidden starting from the fifth nominations of the adults up to the Biga-10 batch.

Celebrities

Adults

Teens

Biga-10

 Big Night 
This season's finale, dubbed as the Biga10 Na Big Night was held on May 29, 2022, in various locations, including the ELJ Communications Center and ABS-CBN Studio 10 As a result of the continuing impacts of COVID-19 pandemic on the Philippines, the show was held to a virtual audience and a minimal live audience with the season's previously eliminated housemates and their relatives in attendance.

The finale featured performances by P-pop groups BGYO and BINI, Connect finalists Kobie Brown and Andi Abaya, as well as 1MX London 2022 artists Bamboo, Ez Mil, Jeremy Glinoga, KZ Tandingan and SAB (also known as Sabine Cerrado). Throughout the Biga-10s stay in the house, a competition was held on Kumu to have a member of its userbase perform on the finale show. Entitled Perform at the PBB Big Night, the winner of the said campaign was singer Chong. SAB, who is also one of the performers, took part in the said campaign, placing fourth place.

Sixteen minutes before voting closed, the Ultimate Big 5 was interrogated by former Big Winners. Anji's question was sent in by Teen 1 winner Kim Chiu, Brenda was then grilled by Double Up winner Melai Cantiveros, Isabel was then questioned by Season 1 winner Nene Tamayo, Rob was then asked by Lucky 7 winner Maymay Entrata and Samantha was grilled by All In winner Daniel Matsunaga virtually.

Results
As with previous votes, the Save-To-Evict voting system is put in play. Voting opened following the announcement of the Ultimate Big 5 and closed forty minutes into the live finale show.

At the end of the night, the placements of the five finalists were made public. Brenda Mage, Rob Blackburn and Samantha Bernardo were proclaimed as the fifth, fourth and third big placers respectively. After a commercial break, Isabel Laohoo was proclaimed the second big placer, thus making Anji Salvacion as the season's Ultimate Big Winner, becoming the show's seventeenth and the fourth celebrity winner of the whole series overall, and the first celebrity to achieve such distinction in a combined season since Daniel Matsunaga in All In.

 Kumunity beneficiaries 
Throughout this season, with Big Brother's help, the housemates were given the chance to provide help for ten beneficiaries, or Kumunities, referring to each beneficiary as a Kumunity, by performing tasks with the aim of giving financial aid or otherwise to the chosen beneficiaries.Celebrities Philippine Mental Health Association, Inc. — A special task was given to Albie to organize a Kumu livestream show where all Kumu diamonds collected will be given to this Kumunity. In addition, the proceeds from their Sa Linyang Kainan weekly task, which they successfully completed, were also given to this Kumunity in the amount of one hundred thousand pesos (₱100,000).
 Philippine Accessible Disability Services, Inc. (PADS) — A special task was given to Alyssa and Madam Inutz to walk using crutches, and get their daily food supply by roaming around the swimming pool ten times. Having completed the task, they gave Verniel Faustrilla, a differently-abled athlete and PADS member, with new arm crutches and sports wheelchair. In addition, after successfully completing the Makuha Ka Sa Tingin weekly task, the housemates gave the amount of one hundred thousand pesos (₱100,000) to this Kumunity.
 Victims of Typhoon Odette — With needed supplies provided by ABS-CBN Foundation, the housemates packed relief goods for distribution to the families affected by Typhoon Odette. A special task was given to Alexa, Anji, Brenda, Eian, Jordan, and KD to organize a Kumu livestream show where all Kumu diamonds collected will be given to the victims and communities affected. In addition, after successfully completing the Andito Tayo Para Sa Isa't Isa weekly task, the housemates gave the amount of one hundred thousand pesos (₱100,000) to this Kumunity, but Big Brother has added more funds to the initial amount and increased to one million pesos (₱1,000,000) as an incentive for the housemates' sacrifices for that week.Adults Isang Daan sa Pagtutulungan — The adult housemates, while doing The Big Online 10-dahan weekly task, will have to sell their products as proceeds from the sale will be donated to ABS-CBN Foundation through Tulong-Tulong sa Pag-ahon: Operation Odette, as part of Isang Daan sa Pagtutulungan, a 100-day series of fundraising activities initiated by ABS-CBN and ABS-CBN Foundation aimed at helping 100,000 families affected by Typhoon Odette. As of February 4, 2022, the housemates collected two hundred forty-nine thousand pesos (₱249,000) to be given to this Kumunity, as announced by main host Bianca Gonzalez during the first eviction night.
 St. Arnold Janssen Kalinga Foundation, Inc. – At Big Brother's request, the adult housemates were asked to think of ideas of which beneficiary they can help. After a round of discussions, they decided to help a particular Kumunity focusing on the impoverished and the homeless; however, they let Big Brother select such beneficiary as they do not know what particular charitable organization focuses on the aforementioned concerns. A day after, Big Brother announced to the adult housemates that the St. Arnold Janssen Kalinga Foundation, Inc. is their next Kumunity in need. A weekly task and charity task was given to Nathan and Michael Ver where the housemates must step on a color-coded part on the floor chosen by a digital roulette, and must use a paddle to pass a ball to another housemate to a container provided in the play area. One hundred pesos (₱100) will be added for every ball inserted in the container. They can shoot a maximum of 1,000 balls for this weekly task, possibly giving one hundred thousand pesos (₱100,000) if they shoot all of the balls to the chosen charity. In the end, the housemates successfully completed their task after shooting 940 balls, giving the housemates the opportunity to give ninety-four thousand pesos (₱94,000) to this Kumunity.Teens Girls Got Game Philippines, Inc. — The teen housemates were informed that they have the chance to help a Kumunity in need, and the Girls Got Game Philippines, Inc. will be the said Kumunity in need of help. The outcome of their Body Photo Mosaic Making weekly task wherein they must successfully mimic a photo mosaic with 324 different pieces of photographs will determine the amount to be given to this Kumunity. As of this date, the amount given by Big Brother and the housemates to this Kumunity was not revealed, nor was posted in each of their social media accounts.
 Bantay Bata: Children's Village — Big Brother revealed on Day 191 that the Bantay Bata: Children's Village will be the next Kumunity in need. To determine the outcome and basis of the donation that Big Brother will donate to this Kumunity, the housemates were given the Big KumuniTEEN Summer Concert weekly task wherein the housemates must create a summer-themed concert throughout the week. The housemates must earn at least 250 diamonds after all of their performances. Big Brother and the housemates donated one hundred thousand pesos (₱100,000) to this Kumunity after the Teen housemates successfully completed the said weekly task.
Another charity task for the same beneficiary was given to the Biga-10 housemates. Named the Biga-10 Bayanihan para sa Bantay Bata, the housemates of three Kumunities were tasked to create a 5-minute superhero-themed play. They must assign one housemate as their brand ambassador/ambassadress of the beneficiary. The public will then select a housemate to become the face of the said beneficiary. The hero's assigned Kumunity that has the highest number of virtual gifts at the end of the livestream on Kumu will become the said ambassador.
 Sinag Kalinga Foundation, Inc. — A beneficiary that houses aged people that do not have a permanent home, this Kumunity beneficiary is the last that they will be giving help for this edition. The housemates were given their last weekly task named the Paper Tower of Tibay where they must make a paper tower that is 7-foot tall. They must make sure that the tower they have made will be sturdy when three heavy diamonds are placed for 100 seconds. The Teen housemates successfully completed the said weekly task but Big Brother did not announce on how much did he donated for this beneficiary during the episodes' broadcast.Biga-10 Science of Identity Foundation, Inc. — Both a weekly task and a charity task, the Biga-10 housemates were given the Baliktad-Bahay weekly task were they must stack 72 colored blocks in the pool area. They must stack those blocks in reverse so that the blocks can be seen correctly as a reflection of the house can be seen in the bottom of the pool as their guide. They must use wooden sticks to transport the blocks into a platform in the middle of the pool. Big Brother and the housemates donated thirty thousand pesos (₱30,000) to this Kumunity after the housemates managed to place 30 blocks after their time have run out.
 Feed Hungry Minds Library, Inc. — The Biga-10 housemates were given a last chance to help a Kumunity in need, therefore the Stacking Colored Tower Cups weekly task was given to them. The housemates must build four colored tower cups that represents the color of their respective Kumunity. They must build their respective colored tower cups and must work altogether on a fourth tower. They must only use their elbows in stacking their cups. Big Brother and the Biga-10 housemates gave one hundred thousand pesos (₱100,000) to this Kumunity after successfully completing their weekly task.

Overall, Big Brother and his housemates have given one million five hundred twenty-four thousand pesos (₱1,524,000) [excluding the undisclosed amounts that were given to three Kumunities during the show's broadcast] to the ten Kumunities that were featured during the show's entire run.

Big Homecoming
A special reunion show entitled  Pinoy Big Brother: Kumunity Season 10 - Big Homecoming was introduced a week after the Big Night was held. Hosted by Bianca Gonzalez-Intal and Robi Domingo, it is composed of a series of interviews on the Final Five of each Kumunity regarding each of the three editions' highlights and their experiences during their stay inside the house during the season's entire run.Uber-Acting marks its return since it was last shown during the Big Night of the previous season. Uber-Acting is a segment wherein the show's previous housemates and even the hosts will re-enact and spoof some of the iconic events that were made by the housemates during their time in the house.

The Big Homecoming aired every weekends for three weeks, spanning from June 4 to 19, 2022, at the same timeslots by the show at 7:45pm on Saturdays after My Papa Pi and 7:00pm on Sundays after TV Patrol Weekend on Kapamilya Channel, A2Z, and on Kapamilya Online Live on YouTube.

 The first big homecoming to be broadcast was from the Teen Kumunity. It was shown on June 4 and 5, with the Teen Kumunity Final Five consisting of fourth big placer Rob Blackburn, Gabb Skribikin, Stephanie Jordan, Maxine Trinidad, and Paolo Alcantara;
 The second big homecoming was from the Adult Kumunity. It was shown on June 11 and 12, with the Adult Kumunity Final Five consisting of second big placer Isabel Laohoo, Nathan Juane, Zach Guerrero, Michael Ver Comaling, and Seham Daghlas; and
 The third and last big homecoming was from the Celebrity Kumunity. It was shown on June 18 and 19, with the Celebrity Kumunity Final Five consisting of Alyssa Valdez, the season's Big Winner Anji Salvacion, third big placer Samantha Bernardo, Madam Inutz, and fifth big placer Brenda Mage.

Reception

Praises
During this season's celebrity edition, the show opened a conversation, both on the show and online, about the mental health struggles of the celebrity housemates. With the help of the show's resident psychologist-psychiatrist Dr. Randy Dellosa, mental health conditions were being addressed on the show, including KD Estrada's anxiety, Albie Casiño's attention deficit hyperactivity disorder, Alexa Ilacad's body dysmorphia, and the housemates' reaction and response on dealing with people diagnosed with such conditions. As such conversations remain a taboo in Filipino society, the move has won praise and appreciation from netizens for normalizing mental health-related conversations.

Controversies and criticisms

Unli-Voting and alleged favoritism of Anji Salvacion
The second nomination week of the celebrity edition saw a tight battle between the set of nominees. Two days prior to the end of voting, the management decided to remove the Kumu voting limit of 10 votes per account per day in a twist called "Unli-Voting." The twist drew some flak amongst avid and loyal viewers, claiming that "it is unfair" as the results wouldn't reflect the choices of the voting audience as a small amount of voters can drastically swing the results for or against a nominee in limited time. It was also seen as a sketchy move intended to save alleged management favorite Anji Salvacion, who was trailing Albie Casiño before unli-voting came into effect, and Salvacion was criticized by viewers for giving a harsh rebuke to fellow nominee KD Estrada, who was struggling with his mental health at the time, causing her to garner a lot of BBEs (votes to evict) prior to the unli-voting announcement.

By the time the voting closed, Salvacion overtook Casiño, who ended up being the second evictee. As a result, the hashtags #PBBUnfair and #PBBCancelUnliVotes trended on Twitter with the fans sending questions on executive producer and director Lauren Dyogi's Twitter, who then explained that they "initially planned it for the first nomination week but it didn't push through because of technical issues." After weeks of further criticism, especially after Estrada and fellow fan favorite Alexa Ilacad were both evicted on the same night, the twist was later cancelled for the Celebrity Batch's final eviction and, by extension, the rest of the season.

Eventually, Salvacion ended up as the season's Big Winner, which sparked criticism of vote-rigging in her favor due to the unexpected 22.21% gap between Salvacion and Isabel Laohoo, mainly from Estrada and Ilacad's supporters who dislike her due to her antagonism towards Estrada while they were inside the house, and also due to Laohoo's wealth being a factor in her getting landslide votes to save whenever she was up for eviction.

Inappropriate remarks
Celebrities
Brenda Mage received backlash from viewers after a clip of him giving inappropriate remarks went viral across social media platforms, which included inappropriate solicitation of sexual favors towards Eian Rances and offensive jokes. Mage apologized to Rances after being reminded by Big Brother in the confession room. Mage also received backlash for allegedly talking bad behind fellow housemate Alexa Ilacad due to both of their relationships with Rances, and the viewers were upset when a Kumu livestream clip showcased Mage talking harshly about Ilacad to his fellow housemate, Madam Inutz. Mage apologized to Ilacad after the conclusion of the Celebrity Edition. Mage eventually finished as the fifth Big Placer to a positive reception from the public, with many describing his second stint inside the house as his redemption arc.

Adults
Michael Ver Comaling received heavy backlash from viewers for allegedly talking about the Juane siblings, Nathan and Raf, behind their backs in a bad manner to fellow housemate Laziz Rustamov, who is a close friend of the said siblings and was uncomfortable with Comaling's actions towards them. Comaling told Rustamov that he gave Raf two points as an act of vengeance since she had given him two points during the last two nominations, while he also questioned Nathan's religiousness, using it to "hide things".

Houseplayer Marky Miranda also received backlash online for having an intense confrontation with two of the housemates, Comaling and Zach Guerrero while the latter was celebrating his birthday inside the House while drinking whiskey. While drunk, Miranda talked to Guerrero about the Final Five and its tasks, the sacrifices they have made to stay in the house, the things that a housemate would expect after living inside the house, and that he doesn't deserve to be in the Final Five. Their intense confrontation trended on Twitter, with the names of Guerrero, Miranda, and fellow housemate Isabel Laohoo topping the trend list along with the official hashtag of the episode. Miranda was criticized for his actions, while he also earned praise for his skills as a houseplayer, with users defining Miranda as the "perfect houseplayer" and "a houseplayer that will be never forgotten", as this was a part of their houseplayer task with Jannene "Ja" Nidoy; to show the authenticity or pagpakatotoo of the housemates. Viewers also praised Guerrero for controlling himself during and after the confrontation. After the said confrontation, Comaling asked Miranda on why did he do that to his fellow housemate, as he was concerned about the friendship that he made while they are still in the house, even though he also talked behind his back about the Juane siblings. Now with Miranda acting enraged, he threw a pitcher on the sink, hitting Laohoo. To ease the confrontation, Big Brother then decided to separate the two to prevent them from fighting. The next day, Miranda and the housemates that were involved in the confrontation apologized for their actions against each other.

Teens
Stephanie Jordan called out Rob Blackburn for allegedly shouting at fellow housemate Kai Espenido as he was participating in K.E.A.'s punishment task, saying "Rob, next time you don't shout because di niya kasalanan 'to, ang sama ng ugali mo Rob!" ("Rob, next time you don't shout because it's not her fault, your attitude is bad Rob!") after Blackburn said "You should be!" to Espenido in an aggravated tone which caused the latter to cry. Jordan reiterated the events outside to Gabb Skribikin and Stef Draper, who were working on their weekly task inside. Jordan went back outside for a while, but quickly went inside again after Skribikin and Maxine Trinidad calmed her down, and Tiff Ronato restrained her from going outside in order for Blackburn to not feel any more pressure. Espenido was still crying when she came back, and Draper said that "it was the third time he (Blackburn) shouted to girls", in which Jordan responded "Di yan pwede guys, di yan pwede! Kahit anong gagawin mo, hindi ka pwede sumigaw sa tao na walang dahilan! Di tayo pwede maging soft sa lalaki na walang utak na ginagamit!" ("That's not allowed guys, that's not allowed! Whatever you do, you can't shout at someone without a reason! We can't be soft to boys that don't use their brains!"), which earned a mixed reaction from viewers. Some praised her for being frank and unfiltered, while others criticized her for the words she used and for being insensitive towards Blackburn, who had told Draper and Trinidad in an earlier episode about trauma he had from being a victim of bullying by his classmates. Blackburn apologized to Espenido the day after the incident. This was a primary factor that caused Jordan to garner a lot of BBEs in succeeding evictions.

During the fifth round of nominations, Gabb Skribikin gave two points to Stephanie Jordan, citing that she hasn't been evicted from the first nomination up to that point, and Skribikin wanted to see "how much can she (Jordan) go". As a result, Skribikin was heavily criticized online for being insensitive towards Jordan, who was nominated for the fifth straight time alongside Skribikin, who herself was nominated for the first time, with many bringing up her widely panned "MaJoHa", "SLEX", and "Sultan Kudarat" blunders during their History Picture Quiz Bee challenge. Both Jordan and Skribikin were saved from eviction by the end of the week, with Jordan topping the polls after four consecutive second-to-last finishes.

Allegations of sexual misconduct 
TJ Valderrama was subjected to controversy after he was spotted touching and looking at Shanaia Gomez in an allegedly sexual manner on several occasions by live feed viewers. This resulted in calls for his immediate removal from the house with the hashtag #ForceEvictTJ trending nationwide on November 20, 2021, alongside "Protect Shanaia Gomez." Gabriela Women's Party, a left-wing Filipino political party which advocates for the protection of women's rights, has also released a statement calling out the show regarding the issue. Moreover, the show and the housemates stated that there was nothing wrong happening, and that the viewers should be careful of what they accuse. Valderrama was eventually evicted on Day 51 while also being the sole housemate to receive a negative vote tally for the season.

History Quiz Bee incorrect answers 
Gabb Skribikin and Kai Espenido were widely criticized across social media platforms for incorrectly answering a question about the collective nickname of three Filipino priests executed during the Spanish colonial period, namely Mariano Gomez, Jose Burgos, and Jacinto Zamora, known as Gomburza, during their History Quiz Bee. Espenido answered "MarJo", while Skribikin answered "MaJoHa". The latter was also criticized for answering "SLEX" to a question about the San Juanico Bridge. Viewers said that the incorrect answers of both Espenido and Skribikin are a symptom of the Philippines' poor education system, and others called for the Department of Education (DepEd) to "open the schools" online. Because of this, Big Brother decided to refreshen the teen housemates' knowledge in Philippine history by giving them quizzes in the form of a Head of Household challenge along with an examination weekly task that was given to them in the following week, though Espenido was already evicted a week prior, thus she didn't participate in the History Week.

Host Robi Domingo, who asked the history questions to the housemates, expressed his disappointment on Twitter a few days after the history quiz bee trended across social media, saying “Sa una, nakakatawa pero habang tumatagal, di na nakakatuwa. Sana maging daan ito para makita kung ano ang kakulangan sa sistema ng ating edukasyon. Sa lahat ng content creators, let's battle #MaJoHa.” ("At first, it's funny but as time passes by, it's not amusing anymore. I hope this will be a way to shed light on the gaps in our education system. To all content creators, let's battle #MaJoHa.")

KD Estrada's anxiety spoof
The show came under fire once again, this time, at the end of the season, for posting a now-deleted teaser of the Big Homecoming that contains a teaser of a spoof of celebrity ex-housemates KD Estrada and Anji Salvacion's confrontation during the Celebrity Edition, where Salvacion told Estrada that "there will never be a chance (of them being together as a loveteam or a couple)", on its social media pages last June 4.  The spoof was done by Teen Edition Plus runner-up and host Robi Domingo and Lucky 7 winner Maymay Entrata portraying Estrada and Salvacion respectively. As a result, the sentences "DEPRESSION IS NOT A JOKE" and "STOP USING KD FOR CLOUT" trended almost immediately on Twitter and Estrada deactivated his Twitter account after the said video went viral across Facebook and Twitter.

Former Otso ex-housemate Wakim Regalado, who also suffers from depression, stated on Twitter that he "rebukes Pinoy Big Brother's insensitive and irresponsible move to trivialize and make fun of Estrada's experience." Fans of Estrada and loveteam partner Alexa Ilacad, as well as fans of the seasons' celebrity, adult, and teen housemates, and the shows' viewers, expressed their support on this matter.

There has yet to be an official word from the show's producers or hosts on the occurrence of the incident.

References

External links
 Pinoy Big Brother: Kumunity Season 10 — Official website

Pinoy Big Brother seasons
2021 Philippine television seasons
2022 Philippine television seasons
Television series impacted by the COVID-19 pandemic
Television productions suspended due to the COVID-19 pandemic